= List of drugs: Trj–Tz =

This multi-page article lists pharmaceutical drugs alphabetically by name. Many drugs have more than one name and, therefore, the same drug may be listed more than once. Brand names and generic names are differentiated by capitalizing brand names.

See also the list of the top 100 bestselling branded drugs, ranked by sales.

Abbreviations are used in the list as follows:

- INN = International nonproprietary name
- BAN = British Approved Name
- USAN = United States Adopted Name
- Two-letter codes for countries

Lists of drugs
1–9 | A | B | C | D | E | F | G | H | I | J | K | L | M | N | O | P | Q | R | S | T | U | V | W | X | Y | Z

Ta–Td | Te | Tf–Th | Ti | Tj–Tq | Tra–Tri | Trj–Tz

== tro ==
=== trob-tron ===
- Trobicin
- Trocaine
- Trocal
- trocimine (INN)
- troclosene potassium (INN)
- trodusquemine (USAN)
- Trofan
- trofosfamide (INN)
- troglitazone (INN)
- troleandomycin (INN)
- trolnitrate (INN)
- tromantadine (INN)
- Trombovar
- trometamol (INN)
- Tromoject
- Tronolane
- Tronothane

=== trop-trox ===
- tropabazate (INN)
- tropanserin (INN)
- tropantiol (USAN)
- tropapride (INN)
- tropatepine (INN)
- tropenziline bromide (INN)
- Trophamine
- Tropicacyl
- tropicamide (INN)
- tropigline (INN)
- tropirine (INN)
- tropisetron (INN)
- troplasminogen alfa (USAN, INN)
- tropodifene (INN)
- troquidazole (INN)
- trospectomycin (INN)
- trospium chloride (INN)
- trovafloxacin (INN)
- Trovan
- trovirdine (INN)
- troxerutin (INN)
- troxipide (INN)
- troxolamide (INN)
- troxonium tosilate (INN)
- troxypyrrolium tosilate (INN)

=== tru-try ===
- Truphylline
- Truqap
- Trurapi
- Trusopt
- Trutakna
- Truvelog
- Truxazole
- Truxcillin
- truxicurium iodide (INN)
- truxipicurium iodide (INN)
- Trymex
- Tryngolza
- tryparsamide (INN)
- Tryptacin
- Tryptyr
- Trysul
- Tryvio

== tu-tw ==
- tuaminoheptane (INN)
- Tubersol
- tubocurarine chloride (INN)
- tubulozole (INN)
- tucaresol (INN)
- Tucks Medicated Pads
- tuclazepam (INN)
- tucotuzumab celmoleukin (USAN)
- Tudriqev
- Tuinal
- tulathromycin (USAN)
- tulobuterol (INN)
- tulopafant (INN)
- Tums
- Turgex
- turoctocog alfa (INN)
- turofexorate isopropyl (USAN)
- turosteride (INN)
- Tusibron
- Tussafed
- Tussigon
- Tussionex
- Tusstat
- tuvatidine (INN)
- tuvirumab (INN)
- Tuyory
- Tuznue
- Tuzucip
- Tuzulby
- Twinject
- Twinrix

== ty-tz ==
- tybamate (USAN, INN)
- Tycolet
- Tyenne
- Tygacil
- Tylenol
- Tylenol with Naproxen
- tylosin (INN)
- Tylox
- tylvalosin (USAN, INN)
- Tymlos
- Tymtran
- Typherix
- tyromedan (INN)
- tyrosine (USAN, INN)
- tyrothricin (INN)
- Tyruko
- Tysabri
- Tyzine
- Tz-3
