= List of drugs: Cp–Cz =

This multi-page article lists pharmaceutical drugs alphabetically by name. Many drugs have more than one name and, therefore, the same drug may be listed more than once. Brand names and generic names are differentiated by capitalizing brand names.

See also the list of the top 100 bestselling branded drugs, ranked by sales.

Abbreviations are used in the list as follows:

- INN = International nonproprietary name
- BAN = British Approved Name
- USAN = United States Adopted Name
- Two-letter codes for countries

Lists of drugs
1–9 | A | B | C | D | E | F | G | H | I | J | K | L | M | N | O | P | Q | R | S | T | U | V | W | X | Y | Z

Ca | Cb–Ce | Cf–Ch | Ci | Cj–Cl | Cm–Co | Cp–Cz

== cp ==
- CPM

== cr ==
=== cre-cri ===
- creatinolfosfate (INN)
- Crenessity
- crenezumab (USAN, INN)
- crenolanib (USAN, INN)
- Creo-Terpin
- Creomulsion Cough
- Creon 10
- Creon 20
- Creon 25
- Creon 5
- Crescormon
- Cresemba
- cresotamide (INN)
- Crestor
- Cresylate
- Crexont
- crilvastatin (INN)
- crinecerfont (USAN, INN)
- Crinone
- crisaborole
- crisnatol (INN)
- Criticare HN
- Crixivan
- Crizanlizumab-tmca
- crizotinib (USAN, INN)

=== cro-cry ===
- croconazole (INN)
- CroFab
- Crofelemer
- crolibulin (USAN, INN)
- Crolom
- Cromolyn
- cromakalim (INN)
- cromitrile (INN)
- cromoglicate lisetil (INN)
- cromoglicic acid (INN)
- Cromoptic
- cronidipine (INN)
- cropropamide (INN)
- croscarmellose (INN)
- crospovidone (INN)
- Crosseal
- cross-linked hyaluronate viscoelastic hydrogel
- crotalidae polyvalent immune fab ovine
- crotamiton (INN)
- Crotan
- crotetamide (INN)
- crotoniazide (INN)
- crovalimab (INN)
- Cruex
- crufomate (INN)
- cryofluorane (INN)
- Cryselle
- Crystamine
- Crysti 1000
- Crysticillin A.S.
- Crystodigin
- Crysvita

== cs-ct ==
- CSP
- CTX
- Ctexli

== cu ==
- Cu-7
- Cubicin
- cupric chloride
- Cuprimine
- cuprimyxin (INN)
- cuproxoline (INN)
- Curosurf
- Curretab
- custirsen (USAN, INN)
- Cutivate
- Cuvitru
- Cuvposa

== cy ==
=== cya ===
- cyacetacide (INN)
- cyamemazine (INN)
- cyanocobalamin (57 Co) (INN)
- cyanocobalamin (58 Co) (INN)
- cyanocobalamin (60 Co) (INN)
- cyanocobalamin (INN)
- Cyanoject
- Cyanokit (Pfizer)

=== cyc ===
==== cycl ====
===== cycla-cycli =====
- Cyclafem
- Cyclaine
- cyclandelate (INN)
- Cyclapen-W
- cyclarbamate (INN)
- cyclazocine (INN)
- cyclazodone (INN)
- Cyclessa
- cyclexanone (INN)
- cycliramine (INN)
- cyclizine (INN)

===== cyclo =====
- cyclobarbital (INN)
- cyclobenzaprine (INN)
- cyclobutoic acid (INN)
- cyclobutyrol (INN)
- Cyclocort
- cyclofenil (INN)
- cycloguanil embonate (INN)
- Cyclogyl
- Cyclomen. Redirects to Danazol.
- cyclomenol (INN)
- cyclomethycaine (INN)
- Cyclomydril
- Cyclopar
- cyclopentamine (INN)
- cyclopenthiazide (INN)
- cyclopentolate (INN)
- cyclophosphamide (INN)
- cyclopregnol (INN)
- cyclopropane (INN)
- cyclopyrronium bromide (INN)
- cycloserine (INN)
- Cyclospasmol
- cyclosporine
- cyclothiazide (INN)
- cyclovalone (INN)

==== cyco-cyfo ====
- Cycofed Pediatric
- cycotiamine (INN)
- cycrimine (INN)
- Cycrin
- Cyfendus
- Cyfolex

=== cyh-cys ===
- cyheptamide (INN)
- cyheptropine (INN)
- Cyklokapron
- Cylate
- Cylert
- Cylex
- Cyltezo
- Cymbalta
- cynarine (INN)
- Cyomin
- cypenamine (INN)
- cyprazepam (INN)
- cyprenorphine (INN)
- cyprodenate (INN)
- cyproheptadine (INN)
- cyprolidol (INN)
- cyproterone (INN)
- Cypsedo
- Cyramza
- cyromazine (INN)
- Cystadane
- Cystadrops
- Cystagon
- Cystaran
- cysteamine bitartrate
- cysteine (INN)
- Cystastat
- Cysto-Conray II
- Cystografin
- Cystospaz
- Cysview

=== cyt ===
- CYT
- Cytadren
- cytarabine (INN)
- Cytalux
- Cytarabine
- CytoGam
- cytomegalovirus immune globulin intravenous human
- Cytomel
- Cytosar-U (Pharmacia & Upjohn Company)
- Cytotec
- Cytovene
- Cytoxan (Bristol-Myers Squibb)
- Cytra-3
- Cytra-K
