= List of drugs: Sj–So =

This multi-page article lists pharmaceutical drugs alphabetically by name. Many drugs have more than one name and, therefore, the same drug may be listed more than once. Brand names and generic names are differentiated by capitalizing brand names.

See also the list of the top 100 bestselling branded drugs, ranked by sales.

Abbreviations are used in the list as follows:

- INN = International nonproprietary name
- BAN = British Approved Name
- USAN = United States Adopted Name
- Two-letter codes for countries

Lists of drugs
1–9 | A | B | C | D | E | F | G | H | I | J | K | L | M | N | O | P | Q | R | S | T | U | V | W | X | Y | Z

Sa–Sd | Se–Sh | Si | Sj–So | Sp–Sub | Suc–Sul | Sum–Sz

== sk-sn ==
- Skelaxin
- Skelex
- Skelid
- Skin Exposure Reduction Paste Against Chemical Warfare Agents
- Skyclarys
- Skysona
- Sleep-Aid
- Sleep-eze 3 Oral
- Sleepinal
- Sleepwell 2-nite
- Slim-Mint
- Slo-Bid
- Slo-Niacin
- Slo-Phyllin
- Slo-Salt
- Slow-K
- Slow-Mag
- Slow-Trasicor
- SMX-TMP
- Snaplets-EX

== so ==
=== sob ===
- sobetirome (USAN)
- sobuzoxane (INN)

=== sod ===
==== sode ====
- sodelglitazar (USAN)

==== sodi ====
===== sodiu =====
====== sodium ======
sodium a-sodium f

- sodium acetrizoate (INN)
- sodium amidotrizoate (INN)
- sodium apolate (INN)
- sodium ascorbate (INN)
- sodium aurothiomalate (INN)
- sodium aurotiosulfate (INN)
- sodium bitionolate (INN)
- sodium borocaptate (10 B) (INN)
- sodium calcium edetate (INN)
- sodium chromate (51 Cr) (INN)
- sodium cyclamate (INN)
- sodium dehydrocholate (INN)
- sodium dibunate (INN)
- sodium diprotrizoate (INN)
- sodium etasulfate (INN)
- sodium feredetate (INN)
- sodium ferric gluconate complex (USAN)

sodium g-sodium t

- sodium gentisate (INN)
- sodium glucaspaldrate (INN)
- sodium gualenate (INN)
- sodium hexacyclonate (INN)
- sodium iodide (125 I) (INN)
- sodium iodide (131 I) (INN)
- sodium iodohippurate (131 I) (INN)
- sodium iopodate (INN)
- sodium iotalamate (125 I) (INN)
- sodium iotalamate (131 I) (INN)
- sodium metrizoate (INN)
- sodium morrhuate (INN)
- Sodium P.A.S.
- sodium phosphate (32 P) (INN)
- sodium picofosfate (INN)
- sodium picosulfate (INN)
- Sodium Polyphosphate-Tin Kit
- sodium stibocaptate (INN)
- sodium stibogluconate (INN)
- sodium sulamyd (INN)
- sodium tetradecyl sulfate (INN)
- sodium timerfonate (INN)
- sodium tyropanoate (INN)

sodium v

- Sodium Versenate

=== sof-sol ===
- sofalcone (INN)
- Sofarin
- Sofdra
- sofigatran (USAN)
- sofinicline (USAN, INN)
- Soflax
- sofpironium bromide (INN)
- Sofra-Tulle
- sograzepide (USAN)
- Sohonos
- solabegron (INN)
- Solage
- solanezumab (USAN, INN)
- Solaquin
- Solaraze
- Solarcaine
- solasulfone (INN)
- Solatene
- Solfoton
- Solganal
- solifenacin succinate (USAN)
- Soliris
- solithromycin (USAN, INN)
- Solodyn
- solpecainol (INN)
- Solu-Cortef
- Solu-Medrol
- Solugel
- Soluvite
- solypertine (INN)

=== som-son ===
- Soma (Meda Pharmaceuticals)
- somagrebove (INN)
- somalapor (INN)
- somantadine (INN)
- somatorelin (INN)
- somatosalm (INN)
- somatostatin (INN)
- somatrem (INN)
- somatropin (INN)
- somatropin pegol (INN)
- Somavert
- somavubove (INN)
- somenopor (INN)
- sometribove stilbazium iodide (INN)
- sometripor stilonium iodide (INN)
- somfasepor (INN)
- somidobove (INN)
- Sominex
- Somnote
- Somophyllin
- Sonata
- Sonazine
- sonedonoson (INN)
- sonepcizumab (INN)
- sonermin (INN)
- Sonorx
- sontuzumab (INN)

=== sop-sos ===
- sopitazine (INN)
- sopromidine (INN)
- soquinolol (INN)
- sorafenib (USAN)
- sorbinicate (INN)
- sorbinil (INN)
- sorbitan laurate (INN)
- sorbitan oleate (INN)
- sorbitan palmitate (INN)
- sorbitan sesquioleate (INN)
- sorbitan stearate (INN)
- sorbitan trioleate (INN)
- sorbitan tristearate (INN)
- Sorbitrate
- soretolide (INN)
- Soriatane
- Sorine
- sorivudine (INN)
- sornidipine (INN)
- Sosol

=== sot-soy ===
- Sotahexal (Hexal Australia) [Au]. Redirects to sotalol.
- sotalol (INN)
- sotatercept (USAN, INN)
- soterenol (INN)
- sothrombomodulin alfa (INN, USAN)
- sotirimod (USAN)
- Sotradecol
- sotrastaurin (USAN)
- Sotret
- Soxazole
- Soy-Dome
- Soyacal
