= List of drugs: Ti =

This multi-page article lists pharmaceutical drugs alphabetically by name. Many drugs have more than one name and, therefore, the same drug may be listed more than once. Brand names and generic names are differentiated by capitalizing brand names.

See also the list of the top 100 bestselling branded drugs, ranked by sales.

Abbreviations are used in the list as follows:

- INN = International nonproprietary name
- BAN = British Approved Name
- USAN = United States Adopted Name
- Two-letter codes for countries

Lists of drugs
1–9 | A | B | C | D | E | F | G | H | I | J | K | L | M | N | O | P | Q | R | S | T | U | V | W | X | Y | Z

Ta–Td | Te | Tf–Th | Ti | Tj–Tq | Tra–Tri | Trj–Tz

== ti ==
- Ti-Screen

=== tia ===
==== tiab-tiap ====
- tiabendazole (INN)
- tiacrilast (INN)
- tiadenol (INN)
- tiafibrate (INN)
- tiagabine (INN)
- Tiamate
- tiamenidine (INN)
- tiametonium iodide (INN)
- tiamiprine (INN)
- tiamizide (INN)
- Tiamol
- tiamulin (INN)
- tianafac (INN)
- tianeptine (INN)
- tiapamil (INN)
- tiapirinol (INN)
- tiapride (INN)
- tiaprofenic acid (INN)
- tiaprost (INN)

==== tiar-tiaz ====
- tiaramide (INN)
- Tiazac
- tiazesim (INN)
- tiazofurine (INN)
- tiazuril (INN)

=== tib-tie ===
- tibalosin (INN)
- tibeglisene (INN)
- tibenelast (INN)
- tibenzate (INN)
- tibezonium iodide (INN)
- tibolone (INN)
- tibric acid (INN)
- tibrofan (INN)
- ticabesone (INN)
- ticagrelor (USAN)
- ticarbodine (INN)
- ticarcillin (INN)
- ticarcillin/clavulanic acid
- TICE BCG (Organon Teknika Corp)
- ticlatone (INN)
- Ticlid
- ticlopidine (INN)
- ticolubant (INN)
- tideglusib (INN)
- tidembersat (INN)
- tidiacic (INN)
- tiemonium iodide (INN)
- tienilic acid (INN)
- tienocarbine (INN)
- tienopramine (INN)
- tienoxolol (INN)

=== tif-tik ===
- tifacogin (INN)
- tifemoxone (INN)
- tifenamil (INN)
- tifencillin (INN)
- tiflamizole (INN)
- tiflorex (INN)
- tifluadom (INN)
- tiflucarbine (INN)
- tiformin (INN)
- tifurac (INN)
- tifuvirtide (INN)
- Tigan
- tigapotide (USAN)
- tigatuzumab (USAN)
- tigecycline (USAN)
- tigemonam (INN)
- tigestol (INN)
- tigloidine (INN)
- Tiject-20
- Tikosyn

=== til ===
- tilactase (INN)
- Tilade
- tilarginine acetate (USAN)
- tilbroquinol (INN)
- tildipirosine (INN)
- tiletamine (INN)
- tilidine (INN)
- tiliquinatine (USAN)
- tiliquinol (INN)
- tilisolol (INN)
- tilivapram (USAN)
- tilmacoxib (USAN)
- tilmicosin (INN)
- tilnoprofen arbamel (INN)
- tilomisole (INN)
- tilorone (INN)
- tilozepine (INN)
- tilsuprost (INN)
- tiludronate (INN)
- tiludronic acid (INN)

=== tim-tin ===
- Tim-AK
- Timecelles
- timefurone (INN)
- timegadine (INN)
- timelotem (INN)
- Timentin
- timepidium bromide (INN)
- timiperone (INN)
- timirdine (INN)
- timobesone (INN)
- timofibrate (INN)
- Timolide
- timolol (INN)
- timonacic (INN)
- timoprazole (INN)
- Timoptic
- tinabinol (INN)
- Tinactin Antifungal
- Tinaderm
- Tinamed
- tinazoline (INN)
- TinBen
- Tindal
- Tindamax
- Ting
- tinidazole (INN)
- tinisulpride (INN)
- tinofedrine (INN)
- tinoridine (INN)
- Tinver
- tinzaparin sodium (INN)

=== tio ===
- tiocarlide (INN)
- tioclomarol (INN)
- tioconazole (INN)
- tioctilate (INN)
- Tiocystin
- tiodazosin (INN)
- tiodonium chloride (INN)
- tioguanine (INN)
- tiomergine (INN)
- tiomesterone (INN)
- tiomolibdate diammonium (USAN)
- tiomolibdic acid (USAN)
- tioperidone (INN)
- tiopinac (INN)
- tiopronin (INN)
- tiopropamine (INN)
- tiosalan (INN)
- tiospirone (INN)
- tiotidine (INN)
- tiotixene (INN)
- tiotropium bromide (INN)
- tioxacin (INN)
- tioxamast (INN)
- tioxaprofen (INN)
- tioxidazole (INN)
- tioxolone (INN)

=== tip-tis ===
- tipapkinogene sovacivec (INN)
- tipelukast (USAN)
- tipentosin (INN)
- tipepidine (INN)
- tipetropium bromide (INN)
- tipifarnib (USAN)
- tipindole (INN)
- tiplasinin (USAN)
- tiplimotide (INN)
- tipredane (INN)
- tiprelestat (INN)
- tiprenolol (INN)
- tiprinast (INN)
- tiprolisant (USAN)
- tipropidil (INN)
- tiprostanide (INN)
- tiprotimod (INN)
- TipTapToe
- tiqueside (INN)
- tiquinamide (INN)
- tiquizium bromide (INN)
- tiracizine (INN)
- tirapazamine (INN)
- tiratricol (INN)
- tirilazad (INN)
- tirofiban (INN)
- tiropramide (INN)
- tirzepatide (INN)
- Tis-U-Sol
- tisagenlecleucel (USAN, INN)
- Tiseb
- Tisit
- tislelizumab (INN)
- tisocalcitate (USAN)
- tisocromide (INN)
- tisopurine (INN)
- tisoquone (INN)
- Tissueblue
- Titralac

=== tiv-tiz ===
- tivanidazole (INN)
- tivantinib (INN)
- tividenofusp alfa (INN)
- tividenofusp alfa-eknm
- tivirapine (INN)
- tivozanib (USAN, INN)
- tixadil (INN)
- tixanox (INN)
- tixocortol (INN)
- tizabrin (INN)
- tizanidine (INN)
- tizolemide (INN)
- tizoprolic acid (INN)
- Tizveni
