= Tuvirumab =

Monoclonal antibody

Monoclonal antibody
- Type: ?
- Source: Human
- Target: hepatitis B virus

Clinical data
- ATC code: none

Identifiers
- CAS Number: 138660-97-6
- ChemSpider: none
- UNII: 31Z0AB5WNC

Tuvirumab is a human monoclonal antibody for the treatment of patients with chronic hepatitis B. It has undergone Phase I clinical trials in 2001.
