= Sevirumab =

Monoclonal antibody

Monoclonal antibody
- Type: ?
- Source: Human
- Target: CMV

Clinical data
- ATC code: none

Identifiers
- CAS Number: 138660-96-5
- ChemSpider: none
- UNII: HV6MT68KKF
- KEGG: D05831
- ChEMBL: ChEMBL2108881

Sevirumab (MSL-109) is a human monoclonal antibody for the treatment of infections with cytomegalovirus in patients with AIDS.
