= Eplontersen =

Medication

Clinical data
- Trade names: Wainua
- Other names: AKCEA-TTR-LRx
- AHFS/Drugs.com: Eplontersen
- License data: US DailyMed: Eplontersen
- Routes of administration: Subcutaneous
- ATC code: N07XX21 (WHO)

Legal status
- Legal status: CA: ℞-only; US: ℞-only; EU: Rx-only

Identifiers
- IUPAC name: all-P-ambo-5'-O-(((6-(5-((tris(3-(6-(2-acetamido-2-deoxy-β-D-galactopyranosyloxy)hexylamino)-3-oxopropoxymethyl))methyl)amino-5-oxopentanamido)hexyl))phospho)-2'-O-(2-methoxyethyl)-5-methyl-P-thiouridylyl-(3'→5')-2'-O-(2-methoxyethyl)-5-methylcytidylyl-(3'→5')-2'-O-(2-methoxyethyl)-5-methyluridylyl-(3'→5')-2'-O-(2-methoxyethyl)-5-methyluridylyl-(3'→5')-2'-O-(2-methoxyethyl)guanylyl-(3'→5')-2'-deoxy-P-thioguanylyl-(3'→5')-P-thiothymidylyl-(3'→5')-P-thiothymidylyl-(3'→5')-2'-deoxy-P-thioadenylyl-(3'→5')-2'-deoxy-5-methyl-P-thiocytidylyl-(3'→5')-2'-deoxy-P-thioadenylyl-(3'→5')-P-thiothymidylyl-(3'→5')-2'-deoxy-P-thioguanylyl-(3'→5')-2'-deoxy-P-thioadenylyl-(3'→5')-2'-deoxy-P-thioadenylyl-(3'→5')-2'-O-(2-methoxyethyl)adenylyl-(3'→5')-2'-O-(2-methoxyethyl)-5-methyluridylyl-(3'→5')-2'-O-(2-methoxyethyl)-5-methyl-P-thiocytidylyl-(3'→5')-2'-O-(2-methoxyethyl)-5-methyl-P-thiocytidylyl-(3'→5')-2'-O-(2-methoxyethyl)-5-methylcytidine
- CAS Number: 1637600-16-8
- DrugBank: DB16199
- UNII: 0GRZ0F5XJ6
- KEGG: D12754

Chemical and physical data
- Formula: C_{296}H_{437}N_{77}O_{156}P_{20}S_{13}
- Molar mass: 8606.39 g·mol^{−1}
- SMILES: COCCO[C@@H]1[C@H](O)[C@@H](COP(O)(=S)O[C@H]2[C@@H](OCCOC)[C@H](n3cc(C)c(N)nc3=O)O[C@@H]2COP(O)(=S)O[C@H]2[C@@H](OCCOC)[C@H](n3cc(C)c(N)nc3=O)O[C@@H]2COP(=O)(O)O[C@H]2[C@@H](OCCOC)[C@H](n3cc(C)c(=O)[nH]c3=O)O[C@@H]2COP(=O)(O)O[C@H]2[C@@H](OCCOC)[C@H](n3cnc4c(N)ncnc43)O[C@@H]2COP(O)(=S)O[C@H]2C[C@H](n3cnc4c(N)ncnc43)O[C@@H]2COP(O)(=S)O[C@H]2C[C@H](n3cnc4c(N)ncnc43)O[C@@H]2COP(O)(=S)O[C@H]2C[C@H](n3cnc4c(=O)[nH]c(N)nc43)O[C@@H]2COP(O)(=S)O[C@H]2C[C@H](n3cc(C)c(=O)[nH]c3=O)O[C@@H]2COP(O)(=S)O[C@H]2C[C@H](n3cnc4c(N)ncnc43)O[C@@H]2COP(O)(=S)O[C@H]2C[C@H](n3cc(C)c(N)nc3=O)O[C@@H]2COP(O)(=S)O[C@H]2C[C@H](n3cnc4c(N)ncnc43)O[C@@H]2COP(O)(=S)O[C@H]2C[C@H](n3cc(C)c(=O)[nH]c3=O)O[C@@H]2COP(O)(=S)O[C@H]2C[C@H](n3cc(C)c(=O)[nH]c3=O)O[C@@H]2COP(O)(=S)O[C@H]2C[C@H](n3cnc4c(=O)[nH]c(N)nc43)O[C@@H]2COP(=O)(O)O[C@H]2[C@@H](OCCOC)[C@H](n3cnc4c(=O)[nH]c(N)nc43)O[C@@H]2COP(=O)(O)O[C@H]2[C@@H](OCCOC)[C@H](n3cc(C)c(=O)[nH]c3=O)O[C@@H]2COP(=O)(O)O[C@H]2[C@@H](OCCOC)[C@H](n3cc(C)c(=O)[nH]c3=O)O[C@@H]2COP(=O)(O)O[C@H]2[C@@H](OCCOC)[C@H](n3cc(C)c(N)nc3=O)O[C@@H]2COP(O)(=S)O[C@H]2[C@@H](OCCOC)[C@H](n3cc(C)c(=O)[nH]c3=O)O[C@@H]2COP(=O)(O)OCCCCCCNC(=O)CCCC(=O)NCC(COCCC(=O)NCCCCCCO[C@@H]2O[C@H](CO)[C@H](O)[C@H](O)[C@H]2NC(C)=O)(COCCC(=O)NCCCCCCO[C@@H]2O[C@H](CO)[C@H](O)[C@H](O)[C@H]2NC(C)=O)OCCC(=O)NCCCCCCO[C@@H]2O[C@H](CO)[C@H](O)[C@H](O)[C@H]2NC(C)=O)O[C@H]1n1cc(C)c(N)nc1=O
- InChI: InChI=1S/C296H437N77O156P20S13/c1-140-89-354(284(402)336-240(140)297)193-79-155(511-538(429,551)479-109-173-161(84-198(493-173)367-133-326-207-246(303)316-128-321-251(207)367)517-543(434,556)478-108-172-158(82-196(491-172)357-96-147(8)260(394)349-291(357)409)514-540(431,553)483-113-177-164(88-202(497-177)371-137-331-212-256(371)342-282(308)345-266(212)400)519-545(436,558)482-111-175-162(85-199(495-175)368-134-327-208-247(304)317-129-322-252(208)368)518-544(435,557)481-112-176-163(86-200(496-176)369-135-328-209-248(305)318-130-323-253(209)369)520-546(437,559)485-121-186-226(235(458-74-64-446-21)276(507-186)372-138-329-210-249(306)319-131-324-254(210)372)526-535(424,425)472-118-181-223(233(456-72-62-444-19)272(501-181)364-99-150(11)263(397)352-294(364)412)523-536(426,427)474-120-184-228(237(460-76-66-448-23)273(503-184)360-92-143(4)243(300)339-287(360)405)528-549(440,562)487-123-187-229(239(462-78-68-450-25)274(505-187)361-93-144(5)244(301)340-288(361)406)529-547(438,560)484-114-178-217(388)230(453-69-59-441-16)268(498-178)358-90-141(2)241(298)337-285(358)403)169(488-193)105-477-542(433,555)516-160-83-197(366-132-325-206-245(302)315-127-320-250(206)366)494-174(160)110-480-539(430,552)513-157-81-195(356-95-146(7)259(393)348-290(356)408)489-170(157)106-475-537(428,550)512-156-80-194(355-94-145(6)258(392)347-289(355)407)490-171(156)107-476-541(432,554)515-159-87-201(370-136-330-211-255(370)341-281(307)344-265(211)399)492-168(159)104-469-531(416,417)524-224-182(506-277(236(224)459-75-65-447-22)373-139-332-213-257(373)343-283(309)346-267(213)401)119-473-533(420,421)522-222-179(499-271(232(222)455-71-61-443-18)363-98-149(10)262(396)351-293(363)411)116-470-532(418,419)521-221-180(500-270(231(221)454-70-60-442-17)362-97-148(9)261(395)350-292(362)410)117-471-534(422,423)525-225-185(504-269(234(225)457-73-63-445-20)359-91-142(3)242(299)338-286(359)404)122-486-548(439,561)527-227-183(502-275(238(227)461-77-67-449-24)365-100-151(12)264(398)353-295(365)413)115-468-530(414,415)467-55-41-33-29-37-48-310-188(380)43-42-44-189(381)314-124-296(466-58-47-192(384)313-51-36-28-32-40-54-465-280-205(335-154(15)379)220(391)216(387)167(103-376)510-280,125-451-56-45-190(382)311-49-34-26-30-38-52-463-278-203(333-152(13)377)218(389)214(385)165(101-374)508-278)126-452-57-46-191(383)312-50-35-27-31-39-53-464-279-204(334-153(14)378)219(390)215(386)166(102-375)509-279/h89-100,127-139,155-187,193-205,214-239,268-280,374-376,385-391H,26-88,101-126H2,1-25H3,(H,310,380)(H,311,382)(H,312,383)(H,313,384)(H,314,381)(H,333,377)(H,334,378)(H,335,379)(H,414,415)(H,416,417)(H,418,419)(H,420,421)(H,422,423)(H,424,425)(H,426,427)(H,428,550)(H,429,551)(H,430,552)(H,431,553)(H,432,554)(H,433,555)(H,434,556)(H,435,557)(H,436,558)(H,437,559)(H,438,560)(H,439,561)(H,440,562)(H2,297,336,402)(H2,298,337,403)(H2,299,338,404)(H2,300,339,405)(H2,301,340,406)(H2,302,315,320)(H2,303,316,321)(H2,304,317,322)(H2,305,318,323)(H2,306,319,324)(H,347,392,407)(H,348,393,408)(H,349,394,409)(H,350,395,410)(H,351,396,411)(H,352,397,412)(H,353,398,413)(H3,307,341,344,399)(H3,308,342,345,400)(H3,309,343,346,401)/t155-,156-,157-,158-,159-,160-,161-,162-,163-,164-,165+,166+,167+,168+,169+,170+,171+,172+,173+,174+,175+,176+,177+,178+,179+,180+,181+,182+,183+,184+,185+,186+,187+,193+,194+,195+,196+,197+,198+,199+,200+,201+,202+,203+,204+,205+,214-,215-,216-,217+,218+,219+,220+,221+,222+,223+,224+,225+,226+,227+,228+,229+,230+,231+,232+,233+,234+,235+,236+,237+,238+,239+,268+,269+,270+,271+,272+,273+,274+,275+,276+,277+,278+,279+,280+,537?,538?,539?,540?,541?,542?,543?,544?,545?,546?,547?,548?,549?/m0/s1; Key:SPMKIPFVYCMYNS-KCPXHCKUSA-N

Eplontersen, sold under the brand name Wainua, is a medication used for the treatment of transthyretin-mediated amyloidosis. It is a transthyretin-directed antisense oligonucleotide. It was developed to treat hereditary transthyretin amyloidosis by Ionis Pharmaceuticals and AstraZeneca.

Eplontersen was approved for medical use in the United States in December 2023 and in the UK in October 2024.

== Medical uses ==
Eplontersen is indicated for the treatment of the polyneuropathy of hereditary transthyretin-mediated amyloidosis in adults. Phase III trials for the treatment of transthyretin amyloid cardiomyopathy have been unsuccessful in reaching primary endpoints.

== Side effects ==
The most common adverse reactions include decreased vitamin A and vomiting.

== Society and culture ==
=== Legal status ===
In October 2024, the Committee for Medicinal Products for Human Use of the European Medicines Agency adopted a positive opinion, recommending the granting of a marketing authorization for the medicinal product Wainzua, intended for the treatment of adults with hereditary transthyretin-mediated amyloidosis (ATTRv) and stage 1 or 2 polyneuropathy. The applicant for this medicinal product is AstraZeneca AB. Eplontersen was authorized for medical use in the European Union in March 2025.

=== Names ===
Eplontersen is the international nonproprietary name.
