= Selepressin =

Chemical compound

Clinical data
- Other names: H-Cys(1)-Phe-Ile-hGln-Asn-Cys(1)-Pro-Orn(iPr)-Gly-NH2
- ATC code: None

Identifiers
- IUPAC name: (2S)-1-[(4R,7S,10S,13S,16S,19R)-19-amino-10-(4-amino-4-oxobutyl)-7-(2-amino-2-oxoethyl)-16-benzyl-13-[(2S)-butan-2-yl]-6,9,12,15,18-pentaoxo-1,2-dithia-5,8,11,14,17-pentazacycloicosane-4-carbonyl]-N-[(2S)-1-[(2-amino-2-oxoethyl)amino]-1-oxo-5-(propan-2-ylamino)pentan-2-yl]pyrrolidine-2-carboxamide
- CAS Number: 876296-47-8
- PubChem CID: 53330936
- ChemSpider: 26609297
- UNII: 8P2T76M0SJ
- ChEMBL: ChEMBL1817709
- CompTox Dashboard (EPA): DTXSID90236538

Chemical and physical data
- Formula: C_{46}H_{73}N_{13}O_{11}S_{2}
- Molar mass: 1048.29 g·mol^{−1}
- 3D model (JSmol): Interactive image
- SMILES: CC[C@H](C)[C@H]1C(=O)N[C@H](C(=O)N[C@H](C(=O)N[C@@H](CSSC[C@@H](C(=O)N[C@H](C(=O)N1)Cc2ccccc2)N)C(=O)N3CCC[C@H]3C(=O)N[C@@H](CCCNC(C)C)C(=O)NCC(=O)N)CC(=O)N)CCCC(=O)N
- InChI: InChI=1S/C46H73N13O11S2/c1-5-26(4)38-45(69)54-30(14-9-17-35(48)60)41(65)56-32(21-36(49)61)42(66)57-33(24-72-71-23-28(47)39(63)55-31(43(67)58-38)20-27-12-7-6-8-13-27)46(70)59-19-11-16-34(59)44(68)53-29(15-10-18-51-25(2)3)40(64)52-22-37(50)62/h6-8,12-13,25-26,28-34,38,51H,5,9-11,14-24,47H2,1-4H3,(H2,48,60)(H2,49,61)(H2,50,62)(H,52,64)(H,53,68)(H,54,69)(H,55,63)(H,56,65)(H,57,66)(H,58,67)/t26-,28-,29-,30-,31-,32-,33-,34-,38-/m0/s1; Key:JCVQBJTWWDYUFQ-MRUTUVJXSA-N

Selepressin (INN; development code FE-202158; also known as [Phe(2),Ile(3),Hgn(4),Orn(iPr)(8)]vasopressin) is a potent, highly selective, short-acting peptide full agonist of the vasopressin 1A receptor and analog of vasopressin which was under development by Ferring Pharmaceuticals for the treatment of vasodilatory hypotension in septic shock.

The Phase 2b/3 adaptive trial (SEPSIS-ACT) was terminated in February 2018 for futility. The trial was halted prior to the initiation of the arm for the highest dosing regimen of 5.0 ng/kg/min.
