= Sofpironium bromide =

Chemical compound

Clinical data
- Trade names: Ecclock, Sofdra, others
- Other names: BBI-4000, BBI 4000
- AHFS/Drugs.com: Monograph
- MedlinePlus: a624052
- License data: US DailyMed: Sofpironium bromide
- Routes of administration: Topical
- Drug class: Anticholinergic
- ATC code: D11AA02 (WHO)

Legal status
- Legal status: US: ℞-only; JP: Rx-only

Identifiers
- IUPAC name: [(3R)-1-(2-Ethoxy-2-oxoethyl)-1-methylpyrrolidin-1-ium-3-yl] (2R)-2-cyclopentyl-2-hydroxy-2-phenylacetate bromide
- CAS Number: 1628106-94-4
- PubChem CID: 86301316
- DrugBank: DB19325
- ChemSpider: 52085312
- UNII: 7B2Y1932XU
- KEGG: D10989
- ChEMBL: ChEMBL3707223

Chemical and physical data
- Formula: C_{22}H_{32}BrNO_{5}
- Molar mass: 470.404 g·mol^{−1}
- 3D model (JSmol): Interactive image
- SMILES: CCOC(=O)C[N+]1(CC[C@H](C1)OC(=O)[C@@](C2CCCC2)(C3=CC=CC=C3)O)C.[Br-]
- InChI: InChI=1S/C22H32NO5.BrH/c1-3-27-20(24)16-23(2)14-13-19(15-23)28-21(25)22(26,18-11-7-8-12-18)17-9-5-4-6-10-17;/h4-6,9-10,18-19,26H,3,7-8,11-16H2,1-2H3;1H/q+1;/p-1/t19-,22+,23?;/m1./s1; Key:FIAFMTCUJCWADZ-JOFREBOKSA-M

Sofpironium bromide, sold under the brand names Ecclock and Sofdra among others, is a medication used to treat hyperhidrosis (excessive sweating). Sofpironium bromide is an anticholinergic agent that is applied to the skin.

It was approved for medical use in Japan in 2020, and in the United States in June 2024.

== Medical uses ==
Sofpironium bromide is indicated for the treatment of primary axillary hyperhidrosis.

== Mechanism of action ==
The pharmacodynamics of sofpironium bromide are unknown.

== Society and culture ==
=== Legal status ===
It was approved for medical use in Japan in November 2020, and in the United States in June 2024.

=== Brand names ===
Sofpironium bromide is the international nonproprietary name.

It is sold under the brand name Ecclock in Japan and under the brand name Sofdra in the US.
