= Hycomine =

Combination drug

Hycomine is a combination drug consisting of the following constituents:

- Hydrocodone
- Chlorpheniramine
- Phenylephrine
- Acetaminophen
- Caffeine

It is a narcotic antitussive and analgesic with multiple actions qualitatively similar to those of codeine.
