= Cruex =

Cruex is the trade name for drugs used to treat skin infections. The active ingredient is either

- Miconazole nitrate, or
- Undecylenic acid (full trade name: Cruex Prescription Strength)
