= Serazapine =

Chemical compound

Clinical data
- Other names: Serazepine; CGS-15040A
- Routes of administration: By mouth
- ATC code: None

Identifiers
- IUPAC name: methyl 2-methyl-1,3,4,16b-tetrahydro-2H,10H-benzo[5,6]pyrazino[2',1':3,4][1,4]diazepino[1,2-a]indole-16-carboxylate
- CAS Number: 115313-22-9
- PubChem CID: 60677
- ChemSpider: 54685
- UNII: 8A8FOB4J3U
- ChEMBL: ChEMBL2110702
- CompTox Dashboard (EPA): DTXSID40869592

Chemical and physical data
- Formula: C_{22}H_{23}N_{3}O_{2}
- Molar mass: 361.445 g·mol^{−1}
- 3D model (JSmol): Interactive image
- SMILES: O=C(OC)C1=C2N(C3=C1C=CC=C3)CC4=CC=CC=C4N5C2CN(C)CC5
- InChI: InChI=1S/C22H23N3O2/c1-23-11-12-24-17-9-5-3-7-15(17)13-25-18-10-6-4-8-16(18)20(22(26)27-2)21(25)19(24)14-23/h3-10,19H,11-14H2,1-2H3; Key:WPGUWABWNUSPMW-UHFFFAOYSA-N

Serazapine (developmental code name CGS-15040A), or serazepine, is a serotonin 5-HT_{2} receptor antagonist that was investigated as a potential treatment for generalized anxiety disorder in the 1990s. In humans, serazapine was well tolerated at doses of 10 to 40 mg and was found to be superior to placebo for reducing anxiety symptoms as indicated by HAM-A scores. However, clinical development was discontinued.
