= Carbachol/brimonidine =

Combination eye drop

Combination of
- Carbachol: Cholinergic agonist
- Brimonidine: Alpha-adrenergic receptor agonist

Clinical data
- Trade names: Yuvezzi
- Other names: Brimochol PF
- AHFS/Drugs.com: Monograph
- MedlinePlus: a626030
- License data: US DailyMed: Carbachol and brimonidine
- Routes of administration: Ophthalmic
- ATC code: None

Legal status
- Legal status: US: ℞-only

Carbachol/brimonidine, sold under the brand name Yuvezzi, is a fixed-dose combination medication used for the treatment of presbyopia. It contains carbachol, a cholinergic agonist; and brimonidine, as the salt brimonidine tartrate, an alpha-adrenergic receptor agonist. It is given via an eye drop.

Carbachol/brimonidine was approved for medical use in the United States in January 2026.

== Medical uses ==
The combination is indicated for the treatment of presbyopia in adults.

== Mechanism of action ==
The combination works by combining carbachol and brimonidine tartrate, the tartrate salt form of brimonidine to work together to constrict the pupil, called miosis.

=== Carbachol ===
Carbachol constricts the pupil, creating a pinhole effect which lets only the most direct and focused light into the eye. This results in closer objects appearing clearer.

=== Brimonidine ===
Brimonidine keeps the pupil from widening again by relaxing opposing muscles in the iris and reducing unnecessary muscle activity. This results in the pupil-constricting effect carbachol does to last longer and remain more controlled. This maintains pupil size that supports clear near vision throughout the day.

== Society and culture ==
=== Legal status ===
Carbachol/brimonidine was approved for medical use in the United States in January 2026.

=== Brand names ===
Carbachol/brimonidine is sold under the brand name Yuvezzi.
