= Telmisartan/amlodipine/indapamide =

Medication

Combination of
- Telmisartan: angiotensin II receptor blocker
- Amlodipine: dihydropyridine calcium channel blocker
- Indapamide: thiazide-like diuretic

Clinical data
- Trade names: Widaplik
- AHFS/Drugs.com: Widaplik
- License data: US DailyMed: Telmisartan, amlodipine, and indapamide
- Pregnancy category: Contraindicated
- Routes of administration: By mouth
- ATC code: None

Legal status
- Legal status: US: ℞-only

Telmisartan/amlodipine/indapamide, sold under the brand name Widaplik, is a fixed-dose combination medication used for the treatment of hypertension (high blood pressure). It contains telmisartan, an angiotensin II receptor blocker; amlodipine, as the besilate salt, a dihydropyridine calcium channel blocker; and indapamide, a thiazide-like diuretic.

The combination telmisartan/amlodipine/indapamide was approved for medical use in the United States in June 2025.

== Medical uses ==
Telmisartan/amlodipine/indapamide is indicated for the treatment of hypertension.

== Society and culture ==
=== Legal status ===
The combination telmisartan/amlodipine/indapamide was approved for medical use in the United States in June 2025.
