= Serlopitant =

Chemical compound

Clinical data
- Routes of administration: By mouth
- ATC code: None

Identifiers
- IUPAC name: 3-[(3aR,4R,5S,7aS)-5-{(1R)-1-[3,5-bis(trifluoromethyl)phenyl]ethoxy}-4-(4-fluorophenyl)octahydro-2H-isoindol-2-yl]cyclopent-2-en-1-one
- CAS Number: 860642-69-9
- PubChem CID: 23653789
- ChemSpider: 24686685
- UNII: 277V92K32B
- KEGG: D09378
- ChEMBL: ChEMBL447955
- CompTox Dashboard (EPA): DTXSID701006599

Chemical and physical data
- Formula: C_{29}H_{28}F_{7}NO_{2}
- Molar mass: 555.537 g·mol^{−1}
- 3D model (JSmol): Interactive image
- SMILES: C[C@H](C1=CC(=CC(=C1)C(F)(F)F)C(F)(F)F)O[C@H]2CC[C@@H]3CN(C[C@H]3[C@@H]2C4=CC=C(C=C4)F)C5=CC(=O)CC5
- InChI: InChI=1S/C29H28F7NO2/c1-16(19-10-20(28(31,32)33)12-21(11-19)29(34,35)36)39-26-9-4-18-14-37(23-7-8-24(38)13-23)15-25(18)27(26)17-2-5-22(30)6-3-17/h2-3,5-6,10-13,16,18,25-27H,4,7-9,14-15H2,1H3/t16-,18-,25-,26+,27+/m1/s1; Key:FLNYCRJBCNNHRH-OIYLJQICSA-N

Serlopitant (INN, codenamed VPD-737) is a drug which acts as an NK_{1} receptor antagonist. It was assessed in clinical trials for the treatment of urinary incontinence and overactive bladder, but while it was superior to placebo it provided no advantage over existing approved drugs, and was not approved for further development for this indication. Serlopitant is now undergoing clinical trials for the treatment of chronic pruritus (itch)

== See also ==
- NK_{1} receptor antagonist
