= Ethinylestradiol/norethisterone acetate =

Pharmaceutical combination

Combination of
- Ethinylestradiol: Estrogen
- Norethisterone acetate: Progestogen

Clinical data
- Trade names: Femlyv, Estrostep, Loestrin, Microgestin, others
- Other names: EE/NETA
- AHFS/Drugs.com: Professional Drug Facts
- License data: US DailyMed: Norethindrone acetate and ethinyl estradiol
- Routes of administration: By mouth
- ATC code: G03AB04 (WHO)

Legal status
- Legal status: CA: ℞-only; US: ℞-only

Identifiers
- CAS Number: 8015-12-1
- PubChem CID: 63020
- KEGG: D04483

Chemical and physical data
- 3D model (JSmol): Interactive image
- SMILES: CC(=O)OC1(CCC2C1(CCC3C2CCC4=CC(=O)CCC34)C)C#C.CC12CCC3C(C1CCC2(C#C)O)CCC4=C3C=CC(=C4)O
- InChI: InChI=1S/C22H28O3.C20H24O2/c1-4-22(25-14(2)23)12-10-20-19-7-5-15-13-16(24)6-8-17(15)18(19)9-11-21(20,22)3;1-3-20(22)11-9-18-17-6-4-13-12-14(21)5-7-15(13)16(17)8-10-19(18,20)2/h1,13,17-20H,5-12H2,2-3H3;1,5,7,12,16-18,21-22H,4,6,8-11H2,2H3/t17-,18+,19+,20-,21-,22-;16-,17-,18+,19+,20+/m01/s1; Key:GEONECATAKDDLT-JDSZYESASA-N

Ethinylestradiol/norethisterone acetate (EE/NETA), or ethinylestradiol/norethindrone acetate, is a combination of ethinylestradiol (EE) and norethisterone acetate (NETA) which is used as birth control and menopausal hormone therapy. EE is an estrogen, while norethisterone acetate (NETA) is a progestin. It is taken by mouth. Some preparations of EE/NETA used in birth control additionally contain an iron supplement in the form of ferrous fumarate.

Norethindrone acetate and ethinyl estradiol have been approved in the US for the prevention of pregnancy as a swallowable tablet since 1968. In 2022, the combination of ethinylestradiol with norethisterone or with norethisterone acetate was the 80th most commonly prescribed medication in the United States, with more than 8 million prescriptions. It is available as a generic medication.

== Medical uses ==
Ethinylestradiol/norethisterone acetate is indicated for use by females of reproductive potential to prevent pregnancy.

Ethinylestradiol/norethisterone acetate is also indicated in women with an intact uterus for the treatment of moderate to severe vasomotor symptoms associated with the menopause; and for prevention of postmenopausal osteoporosis.

== Society and culture ==
=== Legal status ===
In July 2024, the US Food and Drug Administration (FDA) approved Femlyv, the first orally disintegrating tablet for the prevention of pregnancy. Norethindrone acetate and ethinyl estradiol have been approved in the US for the prevention of pregnancy as a swallowable tablet since 1968.

=== Brand names ===
Brand names include Anovlar, Blisovi, Cumorit, Estrostep, Femhrt, Femlyv, Fyavolv, Gildess, Junel, Larin, Leribane, Loestrin, Lo Loestrin (Lo Lo), Mibelas, Microgestin, Minastrin, Norlestrin, Primodos, Taytulla, and Tri-Legest, among others.

== See also ==
- Oral contraceptive formulations
- List of combined sex-hormonal preparations
