= Ustekinumab =

Biopharmaceutical drug

Monoclonal antibody
- Type: Whole antibody
- Source: Human
- Target: IL-12 and IL-23

Clinical data
- Trade names: Stelara
- Other names: CNTO 1275
- Biosimilars: ustekinumab-aauz, ustekinumab-aekn, ustekinumab-auub, ustekinumab-hmny, ustekinumab-kfce, ustekinumab-srlf, ustekinumab-stba, ustekinumab-ttwe, Absimky, Eksunbi, Fymskina, Imuldosa, Jamteki, Otulfi, Pyzchiva, Qoyvolma, Selarsdi, Starjemza, Steqeyma, Usgena, Usrenty, Uzpruvo, Wezlana, Wezenla, Yesintek
- AHFS/Drugs.com: Monograph
- MedlinePlus: a611013
- License data: US DailyMed: Ustekinumab
- Pregnancy category: AU: B1
- Routes of administration: Subcutaneous, intravenous
- Drug class: Immunosuppressant interleukin inhibitor
- ATC code: L04AC05 (WHO)

Legal status
- Legal status: AU: S4 (Prescription only); CA: ℞-only / Schedule D; UK: POM (Prescription only); US: ℞-only; EU: Rx-only; In general: ℞ (Prescription only)

Pharmacokinetic data
- Metabolism: unknown
- Elimination half-life: 15–32 days (average 3 weeks)

Identifiers
- CAS Number: 815610-63-0
- DrugBank: DB05679
- ChemSpider: none
- UNII: FU77B4U5Z0
- KEGG: D09214
- ChEMBL: ChEMBL1201835

Chemical and physical data
- Formula: C_{6482}H_{10004}N_{1712}O_{2016}S_{46}
- Molar mass: 145648.06 g·mol^{−1}

Ustekinumab, sold under the brand name Stelara among others, is a monoclonal antibody medication used for the treatment of Crohn's disease, ulcerative colitis, plaque psoriasis and psoriatic arthritis, targeting both IL-12 and IL-23. It is administered either by intravenous infusion or subcutaneous injection. The antibody targets a subunit of human interleukin 12 and interleukin 23, which are naturally occurring proteins that regulate the immune system and immune-mediated inflammatory disorders. Ustekinumab was developed by Centocor Ortho Biotech.

Ustekinumab (an immunosuppressant interleukin inhibitor) is a fully human IgG1κ monoclonal antibody that binds to the shared p40 protein subunit of interleukin (IL) 12 and 23, thereby preventing them from binding to the IL-12Rβ1 receptor protein expressed on the surface of immune cells. By doing so, ustekinumab prevents the activation of the Th1 and Th17 cytokine pathways, which are central to the pathology of psoriasis, psoriatic arthritis, Crohn's disease and ulcerative colitis.

Ustekinumab is approved to treat Crohn's disease in the United States, Israel, Australia, and the European Union; and ulcerative colitis in the United States, and in the European Union to people who have not responded to more traditional treatments. It was found not effective for multiple sclerosis. It is on the World Health Organization's List of Essential Medicines.

== Medical uses ==
Ustekinumab is used to treat psoriasis. This includes psoriatic arthritis when it affects the skin. It is indicated for the treatment of adult and adolescent patients (12 years and older) with moderate to severe plaque psoriasis (Ps) who are candidates for phototherapy or systemic therapy, and adults with active psoriatic arthritis (PsA) alone or in combination with methotrexate. It is also used to treat moderately to severely active Crohn's disease and moderately to severely active ulcerative colitis.

In the European Union, ustekinumab is authorized for the treatment of moderate to severe plaque psoriasis in people above the age of six years whose condition has not improved with, or who cannot use, other systemic (whole-body) psoriasis treatments, such as ciclosporin, methotrexate or PUVA (psoralen ultraviolet A); active psoriatic arthritis in adults; moderately to severely active Crohn's disease in adults; and moderately to severely active ulcerative colitis in adults.

== Adverse effects ==
The most common side effects include upper respiratory tract infection, headache, fatigue, nausea, vomiting, nasopharyngitis, injection site erythema, vulvovaginal candidiasis/mycotic infection, bronchitis, pruritus, urinary tract infection, sinusitis, abdominal pain, fever, and diarrhea. Clinical trials have shown that subcutaneous ustekinumab was generally well tolerated. Most treatment-emergent adverse events were of mild severity.

=== Pregnancy ===
It is unknown if the medication is safe during pregnancy or breastfeeding.

== Mechanism of action ==
Ustekinumab is designed to interfere with the triggering of the body's inflammatory response through the suppression of certain cytokines. Specifically, it blocks interleukin IL-12 and IL-23 which help activate certain T-cells. It binds to the p-40 subunit of both IL-12 and IL-23 so that they subsequently cannot bind to their receptors.

== History ==
Ustekinumab is a human monoclonal antibody (mAb) discovered through the generation of hybridoma cultures from immunized human immunoglobulin (hu-Ig) transgenic (Tg) mice. In December 2007, a biologic license application with the US Food and Drug Administration (FDA) was filed by Centocor; and Janssen-Cilag International (collaborator) submitted a marketing authorization application to the European Medicines Agency (EMA). In November 2008, the Committee for Medicinal Products for Human Use of the EMA adopted a positive opinion, recommending to grant a marketing authorization for the medicinal product Stelara, 45 mg or 90 mg powder for solution for injection, intended for the treatment of moderate to severe plaque psoriasis in adults who have failed to respond to, or who have a contraindication to, or who are intolerant to other systemic therapies including cyclosporine, methotrexate and psoralen plus ultra- violet A light [PUVA]). The applicant for this medicinal product is Janssen-Cilag International NV.

== Society and culture ==
=== Legal status ===
Ustekinumab is approved in Canada, the European Union, and the United States to treat moderate to severe plaque psoriasis. In September 2013, the US Food and Drug Administration (FDA) approved the use of ustekinumab for the treatment of psoriatic arthritis.

In December 2008, Health Canada approved the use of ustekinumab for the treatment of chronic moderate to severe plaque psoriasis in adults who are candidates for phototherapy or systemic therapy.

Ustekinumab was authorized for medical use in the European Union in January 2009.

The FDA approved ustekinumab in September 2009, for the treatment of adults with moderate to severe plaque psoriasis.

The FDA approved ustekinumab in September 2016, to treat Crohn's disease.

Since September 2017, ustekinumab has been available on the AU Pharmaceutical Benefits Scheme to treat severe Crohn's disease in adults.

In 2019, the European Commission authorized the use of ustekinumab for adults with moderately to severely active ulcerative colitis.

In October 2019, the FDA approved the use of ustekinumab for adults with moderately to severely active ulcerative colitis.

==== Biosimilars ====
In October 2023, ustekinumab-auub (Wezlana) was approved for medical use in the United States.

In November 2023, the Committee for Medicinal Products for Human Use (CHMP) of the European Medicines Agency (EMA) adopted a positive opinion, recommending the granting of a marketing authorization for the medicinal product Uzpruvo, intended for the treatment of plaque psoriasis, including pediatric plaque psoriasis, psoriatic arthritis and Crohn's disease in adults. The applicant for this medicinal product is STADA Arzneimittel AG. Uzpruvo is a biosimilar medicinal product. Uzpruvo was authorized for medical use in the European Union in January 2024.

In November 2023, Jamteki was approved for medical use in Canada.

In December 2023, Wezlana and Wezlana I.V. were approved for medical use in Canada.

In February 2024, the CHMP adopted a positive opinion, recommending the granting of a marketing authorization for the medicinal product Pyzchiva, intended for the treatment of plaque psoriasis, including pediatric plaque psoriasis, psoriatic arthritis, ulcerative colitis and Crohn's disease in adults. The applicant for this medicinal product is Samsung Bioepis NL B.V. Pyzchiva is a biosimilar medicinal product. Pyzchiva was authorized for medical use in the European Union in April 2024.

Ustekinumab-aekn (Selarsdi) was approved for medical use in the United States in April 2024.

In April 2024, the CHMP adopted a positive opinion, recommending the granting of a marketing authorization for the medicinal product Wezenla, intended for the treatment of plaque psoriasis, including pediatric plaque psoriasis, psoriatic arthritis, and Crohn's disease in adults. The applicant for this medicinal product is Amgen Technology (Ireland) UC. Wezenla was authorized for medical use in the European Union in June 2024.

Ustekinumab-ttwe (Pyzchiva) was approved for medical use in the United States in June 2024.

In June 2024, the CHMP recommended granting a marketing authorization for Steqeyma, a biosimilar medicine for the treatment of adults with moderately-to severely-active Crohn's disease, plaque psoriasis, pediatric plaque psoriasis and psoriatic arthritis. The applicant for this medicinal product is Celltrion Healthcare Hungary Kft. Steqeyma was authorized for medical use in the European Union in August 2024.

In July 2024, the CHMP adopted a positive opinion, recommending the granting of a marketing authorization for the medicinal product Eksunbi, intended for the treatment of plaque psoriasis, including pediatric plaque psoriasis, psoriatic arthritis, ulcerative colitis and Crohn's disease in adults. The applicant for this medicinal product is Samsung Bioepis NL B.V. Eksunbi is a biosimilar medicinal product. Eksunbi is a biosimilar medicinal product. Eksunbi was authorized for medical use in the European Union in September 2024.

In July 2024, the CHMP adopted a positive opinion, recommending the granting of a marketing authorization for the medicinal product Otulfi, intended for the treatment of adults and children with plaque psoriasis and adults with psoriatic arthritis or Crohn's disease. The applicant for this medicinal product is Fresenius Kabi Deutschland GmbH. Otulfi is a biosimilar medicinal product. Otulfi was authorized for medical use in the European Union in September 2024.

In July 2024, the CHMP adopted a positive opinion, recommending the granting of a marketing authorization for the medicinal product Fymskina, intended for the treatment of adults and children with plaque psoriasis and adults with psoriatic arthritis, ulcerative colitis or Crohn's disease. The applicant for this medicinal product is Formycon AG. Fymskina is a biosimilar medicinal product. Fymskina was authorized for medical use in the European Union in September 2024.

In July 2024, Steqeyma and Steqeyma IV were approved for medical use in Canada.

In August 2024, Pyzchiva and Pyzchiva I.V. were approved for medical use in Canada.

Steqeyma was approved for medical use in Australia in September 2024.

In September 2024, ustekinumab-aauz (Otulfi) was approved for medical use in the United States.

Ustekinumab-srlf (Imuldosa) was approved for medical use in the United States in October 2024.

In October 2024, the CHMP adopted a positive opinion, recommending the granting of a marketing authorization for the medicinal product Absimky, intended for the treatment of people with plaque psoriasis and adults with psoriatic arthritis, Crohn's disease, or ulcerative colitis. The applicant for this medicinal product is Accord Healthcare S.L.U. Absimky is a biosimilar medicinal product. Absimky was authorized for medical use in the European Union in December 2024.

In October 2024, the CHMP adopted a positive opinion, recommending the granting of a marketing authorization for the medicinal product Imuldosa, intended for the treatment of people with plaque psoriasis and adults with psoriatic arthritis or Crohn's disease. The applicant for this medicinal product is Accord Healthcare S.L.U. Imuldosa is a biosimilar medicinal product. Imuldosa was authorized for medical use in the European Union in December 2024.

Ustekinumab-kfce (Yesintek) was approved for medical use in the United States in December 2024.

In December 2024, the CHMP adopted a positive opinion, recommending the granting of a marketing authorization for the medicinal product Yesintek, intended for the treatment of adults and children with plaque psoriasis and adults with psoriatic arthritis or Crohn's disease. The applicant for this medicinal product is Biosimilar Collaborations Ireland Limited. Yesintek is a biosimilar medicinal product that is highly similar to the reference product Stelara, which was authorized in the EU in February 2025.

Ustekinumab-stba (Steqeyma) was approved for medical use in the United States in December 2024.

In March 2025, the CHMP adopted a positive opinion, recommending the granting of a marketing authorization for the medicinal product Qoyvolma, intended for the treatment of adults and children with plaque psoriasis and adults with psoriatic arthritis, Crohn's disease or ulcerative colitis. The applicant for this medicinal product is Celltrion Healthcare Hungary Kft. Qoyvolma is a biosimilar medicinal product that is highly similar to the reference product Stelara. Qoyvolma was authorized for medical use in the EU in June 2025.

Ustekinumab-hmny, (Starjemza) was approved for medical use in the United States in May 2025.

In June 2025, the CHMP adopted a positive opinion, recommending the granting of a marketing authorization for the medicinal product Usymro, intended for the treatment of plaque psoriasis, psoriatic arthritis and Crohn's disease. The applicant for this medicinal product is ELC Group s.r.o. Usymro is a biosimilar medicinal product that is highly similar to the reference product Stelara.

In July 2025, the CHMP adopted a positive opinion, recommending the granting of a marketing authorization for the medicinal product Usrenty, intended for the treatment of adults and children with plaque psoriasis and adults with psoriatic arthritis or Crohn's disease. The applicant for this medicinal product is Biosimilar Collaborations Ireland Limited. Usrenty is a biosimilar medicinal product that is highly similar to the reference product Stelara. Usrenty was authorized for medical use in the EU in June 2025.

In September 2025, the CHMP adopted a positive opinion, recommending the granting of a marketing authorization for the medicinal product Usgena, intended for the treatment of adults and children with plaque psoriasis, and adults with psoriatic arthritis, Crohn's disease, and ulcerative colitis. The applicant for this medicinal product is STADA Arzneimittel AG. Usgena is a biosimilar medicinal product that is highly similar to the reference product Stelara. Usgena was authorized for medical use in the European Union in November 2025.
