= List of drugs: 1–9 =

This multi-page article lists pharmaceutical drugs alphabetically by name. Many drugs have more than one name and, therefore, the same drug may be listed more than once. Brand names and generic names are differentiated by capitalizing brand names.

See also the list of the top 100 bestselling branded drugs, ranked by sales.

Abbreviations are used in the list as follows:

- INN = International nonproprietary name
- BAN = British Approved Name
- USAN = United States Adopted Name
- Two-letter codes for countries

Lists of drugs
1–9 | A | B | C | D | E | F | G | H | I | J | K | L | M | N | O | P | Q | R | S | T | U | V | W | X | Y | Z

- 1-Day
- 2-CdA
- 2-PAM
- 25I-NBOME
- 292 MEP
- 311C90
- 3F8
- 3M Avagard
- 3M Cavilon Skin Cleanser
- 3TC
- 5-ASA
- 5-FC
- 5-FU
- 6-MP
- 642 Tablet
- 8-Hour Bayer (Extended-release Bayer 8-Hour), a form of aspirin
- 8-methoxy-psoralen, also known as methoxsalen (INN)
- 8-Mop or 8-methoxy-psoralen, also known as methoxsalen (INN)
