= Lists of drugs =

There are many hundreds of thousands of possible drugs. Any chemical substance with biological activity may be considered a drug. This list categorises drugs alphabetically and also by other categorisations.

This multi-page article lists pharmaceutical drugs alphabetically by name. Many drugs have more than one name and, therefore, the same drug may be listed more than once. Brand names and generic names are differentiated by capitalizing brand names.

See also the list of the top 100 bestselling branded drugs, ranked by sales.

Abbreviations are used in the list as follows:

- INN = International nonproprietary name
- BAN = British Approved Name
- USAN = United States Adopted Name
- Two-letter codes for countries

Lists of drugs
1–9 | A | B | C | D | E | F | G | H | I | J | K | L | M | N | O | P | Q | R | S | T | U | V | W | X | Y | Z

== General ==
- List of bestselling drugs
- List of drugs by year of discovery

== By chemical structure ==
=== Depressants ===
- Comparison of psychoactive alcohols in alcoholic drinks
- List of benzodiazepines

=== Hallucinogens ===
- List of hallucinogens
  - List of psychedelic drugs
    - List of 2C-* drugs
    - List of DO* drugs
    - List of substituted phenethylamines
    - List of substituted tryptamines
    - List of lysergamides
  - List of cannabinoids
    - Comparison of phytocannabinoids
    - Synthetic cannabinoids
      - List of AM cannabinoids
      - List of CP cannabinoids
      - List of HU cannabinoids
      - List of JWH cannabinoids
      - List of miscellaneous designer cannabinoids

=== Stimulants ===
- List of cocaine analogues
- List of methylphenidate analogues
- List of modafinil analogues and derivatives
- List of substituted cathinones

=== Misc ===
- List of antidepressants
- List of androgen esters
- List of corticosteroid esters
- List of estrogen esters
- List of tetracyclic antidepressants
- List of tricyclic antidepressants
- List of substituted α-alkyltryptamines
- List of substituted amphetamines
- List of substituted benzofurans
- List of substituted methylenedioxyphenethylamines

== By biological activity ==
- List of androgen esters
- List of androgens/anabolic steroids
- List of anaesthetic drugs
- List of antiandrogens
- List of antibiotics
- List of antipsychotics
- List of antiviral drugs
- List of corticosteroid esters
- List of corticosteroids
- List of designer drugs
- List of drugs affected by grapefruit
- List of estrogen esters
- List of nasal decongestants
- List of nonsteroidal anti-inflammatory drug
- List of opioids
- List of progestogens
- List of psychedelic drugs
- List of psychotropic medications
- List of selective estrogen receptor modulators
- List of tetracyclic antidepressants
- List of tricyclic antidepressants
- Lists of investigational drugs

== By medical application ==
- List of drugs known for off-label use
- List of psychiatric medications
- List of psychiatric medications by condition treated
- List of psychiatric drugs by type
- List of veterinary drugs

== By other institutional aspects ==
- List of approved antidepressants
- List of controlled drugs in the United Kingdom
- List of drugs banned from the Olympics
- List of Schedule I drugs (US)
- List of Schedule II drugs (US)
- List of Schedule III drugs (US)
- List of Schedule IV drugs (US)
- List of Schedule V drugs (US)
- List of withdrawn drugs
- List of World Health Organization Essential Medicines

== By investigational drug ==
- List of investigational acne drugs
- List of investigational aggression drugs
- List of investigational agitation drugs
- List of investigational analgesics
- List of investigational antidepressants
- List of investigational antipsychotics
- List of investigational anxiety disorder drugs
- List of investigational attention deficit hyperactivity disorder drugs
- List of investigational autism and pervasive developmental disorder drugs
- List of investigational bipolar disorder drugs
- List of investigational borderline personality disorder drugs
- List of investigational chronobiotics
- List of investigational cognition and memory disorder drugs
- List of investigational eating disorder drugs
- List of investigational fatigue drugs
- List of investigational fibromyalgia drugs
- List of investigational generalized anxiety disorder drugs
- List of investigational hair loss drugs
- List of investigational hallucinogens and entactogens
- List of investigational headache and migraine drugs
- List of investigational insomnia drugs
- List of investigational long COVID drugs
- List of investigational ME/CFS drugs
- List of investigational narcolepsy and hypersomnia drugs
- List of investigational obsessive–compulsive disorder drugs
- List of investigational orthostatic intolerance drugs
- List of investigational other psychiatric disorder drugs
- List of investigational panic disorder drugs
- List of investigational Parkinson's disease drugs
- List of investigational PMS/PMDD drugs
- List of investigational post-traumatic stress disorder drugs
- List of investigational Prader–Willi syndrome drugs
- List of investigational restless legs syndrome drugs
- List of investigational sex-hormonal agents
- List of investigational sexual dysfunction drugs
- List of investigational sleep apnea drugs
- List of investigational social anxiety disorder drugs
- List of investigational substance-related disorder drugs
- List of investigational tinnitus drugs
- List of investigational Tourette's syndrome drugs

== See also ==
- Development and discovery of SSRI drugs
- Channel modulator, for links to articles referring to drugs that modulate ion channels.
- List of monoclonal antibodies
- List of off-label promotion pharmaceutical settlements
- List of schedules for drugs and poisons
- List of steroid abbreviations
- List of plants used for smoking
- List of neurosteroids
