= List of largest selling pharmaceutical products =

== Current largest selling pharmaceuticals of global market ==
The top ten best-selling pharmaceuticals of 2025. Sales in billion USD.

| Rank | Drug | Main indication | Trade name | Sales |
|---|---|---|---|---|
| 1 | pembrolizumab | oncology | Keytruda | 31.6 |
| 2 | tirzepatide | diabetes, obesity | Mounjaro | 23.0 |
| 3 | semaglutide | diabetes, obesity | Ozempic | 19.2 |
| 4 | dupilumab | atopic dermatitis | Dupixent | 17.8 |
| 5 | risankizumab | plaque psoriasis | Skyrizi | 17.6 |
| 6 | apixaban | anticoagulant | Eliquis | 14.7 |
| 7 | daratumumab | multiple myeloma | Darzalex | 14.4 |
| 8 | Bictegravir/emtricitabine/ tenofovir alafenamide | HIV/AIDS | Biktarvy | 14.3 |
| 9 | tirzepatide | diabetes, obesity | Zepbound | 13.5 |
| 10 | semaglutide | diabetes, obesity | Wegovy | 12.0 |

== Historical largest selling pharmaceuticals ==
=== 2020-2024 ===
==== 2024 ====
The top ten best-selling pharmaceuticals of 2024. Sales in billion USD.

| Rank | Drug | Main indication | Trade name | Sales |
|---|---|---|---|---|
| 1 | pembrolizumab | oncology | Keytruda | 29.5 |
| 2 | semaglutide | diabetes, obesity | Ozempic | 17.5 |
| 3 | dupilumab | atopic dermatitis | Dupixent | 14.1 |
| 4 | Bictegravir/emtricitabine/ tenofovir alafenamide | HIV/AIDS | Biktarvy | 13.4 |
| 5 | apixaban | anticoagulant | Eliquis | 13.3 |
| 6 | risankizumab | plaque psoriasis | Skyrizi | 11.7 |
| 7 | daratumumab | multiple myeloma | Darzalex | 11.7 |
| 8 | tirzepatide | diabetes, obesity | Mounjaro | 11.5 |
| 9 | ustekinumab | psoriasis | Stelara | 10.4 |
| 10 | elexacaftor/tezacaftor/ivacaftor | cystic fibrosis | Trikafta | 10.2 |

==== 2023 ====
The top ten best-selling pharmaceuticals of 2023. Sales in billion USD.

| Rank | Drug | Main indication | Trade name | Sales |
|---|---|---|---|---|
| 1 | pembrolizumab | oncology | Keytruda | 25.0 |
| 2 | adalimumab | rheumatoid arthritis | Humira | 14.4 |
| 3 | semaglutide | diabetes, obesity | Ozempic | 13.9 |
| 4 | apixaban | anticoagulant | Eliquis | 12.2 |
| 5 | Bictegravir/emtricitabine/ tenofovir alafenamide | HIV/AIDS | Biktarvy | 11.9 |
| 6 | dupilumab | atopic dermatitis | Dupixent | 11.6 |
| 7 | Pfizer–BioNTech COVID-19 vaccine | COVID-19 vaccination | Comirnaty | 11.2 |
| 8 | ustekinumab | psoriasis | Stelara | 10.9 |
| 9 | daratumumab | multiple myeloma | Darzalex | 9.7 |
| 10 | nivolumab | oncology | Opdivo | 9.0 |

==== 2022 ====
The top ten best-selling pharmaceuticals of 2022. Sales in billion USD.

| Rank | Drug | Main indication | Trade name | Sales |
|---|---|---|---|---|
| 1 | Pfizer–BioNTech COVID-19 vaccine | COVID-19 vaccination | Comirnaty | 40.8 |
| 2 | Moderna COVID-19 vaccine | COVID-19 vaccination | Spikevax | 21.8 |
| 3 | adalimumab | rheumatoid arthritis | Humira | 21.6 |
| 4 | pembrolizumab | oncology | Keytruda | 21.0 |
| 5 | nirmatrelvir/ritonavir | COVID-19 | Paxlovid | 19.0 |
| 6 | apixaban | anticoagulant | Eliquis | 11.8 |
| 7 | Bictegravir/emtricitabine/ tenofovir alafenamide | HIV/AIDS | Biktarvy | 10.4 |
| 8 | aflibercept | macular degeneration, colorectal cancer | Eylea | 10.3 |
| 9 | ustekinumab | psoriasis | Stelara | 10.1 |
| 10 | lenalidomide | oncology | Revlimid | 10.0 |

==== 2021 ====
The top ten best-selling pharmaceuticals of 2021. Sales in billion USD.

| Rank | Drug | Main indication | Trade name | Sales |
|---|---|---|---|---|
| 1 | Pfizer–BioNTech COVID-19 vaccine | COVID-19 vaccination | Comirnaty | 36.9 |
| 2 | adalimumab | rheumatoid arthritis | Humira | 20.7 |
| 3 | Moderna COVID-19 vaccine | COVID-19 vaccination | Spikevax | 17.7 |
| 4 | pembrolizumab | oncology | Keytruda | 17.2 |
| 5 | lenalidomide | oncology | Revlimid | 12.8 |
| 6 | apixaban | anticoagulant | Eliquis | 10.8 |
| 7 | ustekinumab | psoriasis | Stelara | 9.1 |
| 8 | Bictegravir/emtricitabine/ tenofovir alafenamide | HIV/AIDS | Biktarvy | 8.6 |
| 9 | nivolumab | oncology | Opvido | 7.6 |
| 10 | dulaglutide | diabetes | Trulicity | 6.5 |

==== 2020 ====
The top ten best-selling pharmaceuticals of 2020. Sales in billion USD.

| Rank | Drug | Main indication | Trade name | Sales |
|---|---|---|---|---|
| 1 | adalimumab | rheumatoid arthritis | Humira | 20.4 |
| 2 | pembrolizumab | oncology | Keytruda | 14.4 |
| 3 | lenalidomide | oncology | Revlimid | 12.2 |
| 4 | apixaban | anticoagulant | Eliquis | 9.2 |
| 5 | aflibercept | macular degeneration, colorectal cancer | Eylea | 8.4 |
| 6 | ustekinumab | psoriasis | Stelara | 7.9 |
| 7 | nivolumab | oncology | Opvido | 7.9 |
| 8 | ibrutinib | oncology | Imbruvica | 7.6 |
| 9 | Bictegravir/emtricitabine/ tenofovir alafenamide | HIV/AIDS | Biktarvy | 7.3 |
| 10 | rivaroxaban | anticoagulant | Xarelto | 6.9 |

=== 2012-2019 ===
Top five best-selling pharmaceuticals 2012-2019.

==== 2019 ====
1. adalimumab
2. pembrolizumab
3. lenalidomide
4. apixaban
5. nivolumab

==== 2018 ====
1. adalimumab
2. lenalidomide
3. pembrolizumab
4. trastuzumab
5. bevacizumab

==== 2017 ====
1. adalimumab
2. lenalidomide
3. rituximab
4. trastuzumab
5. bevacizumab

==== 2016 ====
1. adalimumab
2. ledipasvir
3. etanercept
4. rituximab
5. infliximab

==== 2015 ====
1. adalimumab
2. ledipasvir
3. etanercept
4. infliximab
5. rituximab

==== 2014 ====
1. adalimumab
2. sofosbuvir
3. infliximab
4. rituximab
5. etanercept

==== 2013 ====
1. aripiprazole
2. adalimumab
3. esomeprazole
4. rosuvastatin
5. etanercept

==== 2012 ====
1. adalimumab
2. infliximab
3. etanercept
4. fluticasone/salmeterol
5. rituximab

=== 2000-2011 ===
Cumulative top ten best-selling pharmaceuticals between 2000 and 2011. Sales in billion USD

| Rank | Drug | Main indication | Trade name | Sales |
|---|---|---|---|---|
| 1 | atorvastatin | cholesterol | Lipitor | 121.4 |
| 2 | clopidogrel | heart disease | Plavix | 74.6 |
| 3 | fluticasone/salmeterol | asthma | Advair | 58.8 |
| 4 | olanzapine | schizophrenia, bipolar disorder | Zyprexa | 50.4 |
| 5 | etanercept | rheumatoid arthritis | Enbrel | 45.2 |
| 6 | esomeprazole | gastrointestinal disorders | Nexium | 44.3 |
| 7 | montelukast | asthma | Singulair | 38.5 |
| 7 | quetiapine fumarate | schizophrenia, bipolar disorder | Seroquel | 36.7 |
| 9 | enoxaparin | anticoagulant | Lovenox | 33.1 |
| 10 | adalimumab | rheumatoid arthritis | Humira | 32.0 |

== See also ==
- List of drugs
- Lists about the pharmaceutical industry
