= Insulin analogue =

Modified forms of synthetic insulin

The relative effectiveness of each insulin analogue over time

An insulin analogue (also called an insulin analog) is a type of medical insulin that has been modified to alter its pharmacokinetic properties while maintaining the same biological function as human insulin. These modifications are achieved through genetic engineering, which allows for changes in the amino acid sequence of insulin to optimize its absorption, distribution, metabolism, and excretion (ADME) characteristics.

All insulin analogues work by enhancing glucose uptake in tissues and reducing glucose production by the liver. They are prescribed for conditions such as type 1 diabetes, type 2 diabetes, gestational diabetes, and diabetes-related complications such as diabetic ketoacidosis. Additionally, insulin is sometimes administered alongside glucose to treat elevated blood potassium levels (hyperkalemia).

Insulin analogues are classified based on their duration of action. Short-acting (bolus) insulin analogues, such as insulin lispro, insulin aspart, and insulin glulisine, have been designed to be absorbed quickly, mimicking the natural insulin response after meals. Long-acting (basal) insulin analogues, including insulin glargine, insulin detemir, and insulin degludec, provide a sustained release of insulin to maintain basal blood glucose levels over an extended period. These modifications enhance the predictability of insulin therapy and reduce the risk of hypoglycemia compared to regular human insulin.

Lispro, the first insulin analogue, was approved in 1996. This was followed by an influx of new analogues with differing pharmacokinetic properties. The first long-acting analogue, insulin glargine, was approved in 2000. Insulin aspart, insulin glulisine, and insulin detemir were all approved by 2005. The second wave of insulin analogues, which include insulin degludec and insulin icodec, started in the 2010s. Insulin analogues are on the World Health Organization's List of Essential Medicines.

== Mechanisms of action ==
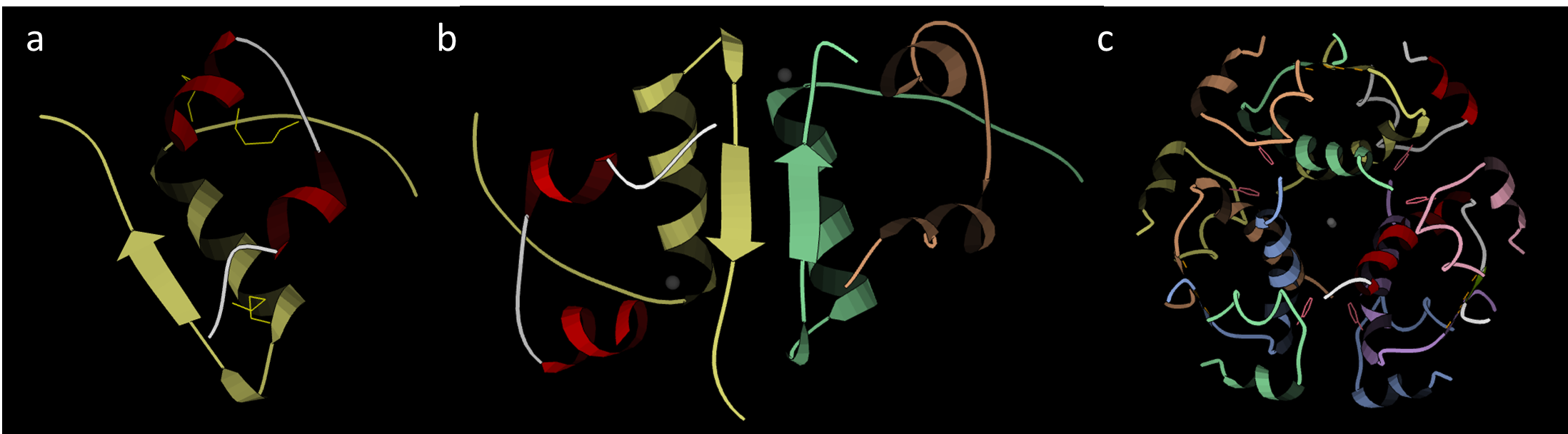
Different forms of insulin structure. Insulin monomer (a), dimer (b) and hexamer (c)

Insulin analogues are recombinant proteins that are structurally based on human insulin but have been modified through amino acid substitutions or additions to alter their pharmacokinetic properties. These modifications are designed to either accelerate or prolong subcutaneous absorption while maintaining the biological function of insulin in regulating blood glucose levels. Native human insulin, commonly referred to as regular insulin, naturally assembles into hexamers, which must gradually dissociate into dimers and then monomers before they can be absorbed into the bloodstream. This process results in a delayed onset of action, making the timing of insulin administration a critical factor in diabetes management.

Short-acting insulin analogues are developed to have a shorter duration of action than regular insulin, while long-acting insulin analogues are meant to have a peakless action profile and a prolonged duration of action.

=== Short-acting ===
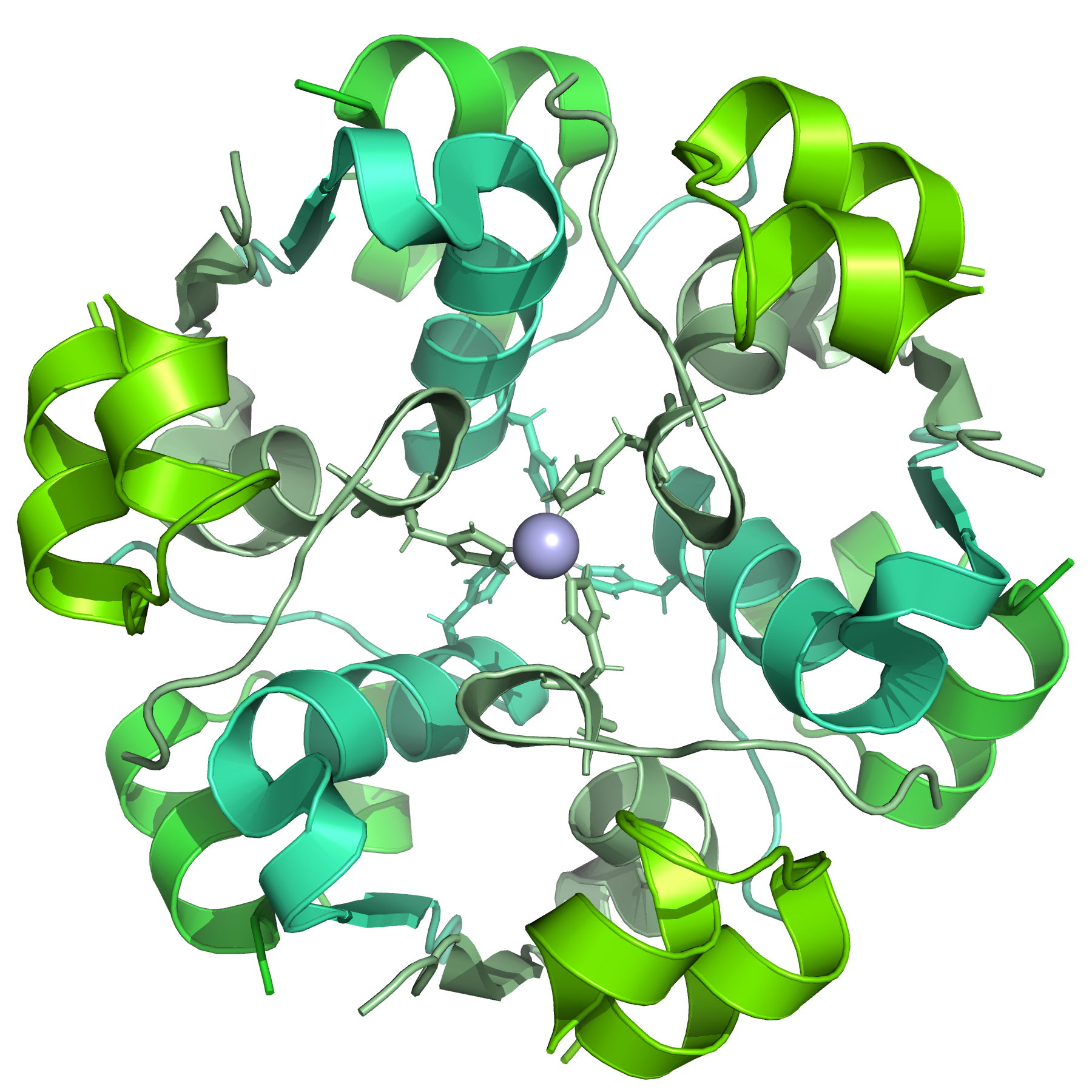
Diagram of an insulin glulisine dodecamer. The histidine residues coordinating the central zinc atom are shown as sticks, and the zinc atom itself as a pale blue sphere.

Short-acting insulin analogues are modified forms of recombinant human insulin designed to enhance subcutaneous absorption and accelerate glycemic control. In standard insulin formulations, regular insulin monomers naturally aggregate into hexamers, a configuration that delays absorption and prolongs the onset of action. Before entering the bloodstream, these hexamers must dissociate into dimers and then monomers, which slows their availability for glucose regulation. To address this limitation, insulin analogues have been engineered to maintain a monomeric or dimeric configuration, allowing for faster absorption and reducing the time to onset to approximately 5 to 15 minutes. Insulin lispro, insulin aspart, and insulin glulisine are the most widely used short-acting insulin analogues. These formulations are structurally identical to human insulin, except for amino acid substitutions at one or two positions, which modify their stability and absorption characteristics.

Insulin lispro, which was first approved in 1996 and marketed as Humalog among others, works by reversing the final lysine and proline residues on the C-terminal end of the B-chain. This modification does not alter receptor binding, but blocks the formation of insulin dimers and hexamers. Clinical studies have demonstrated that the use of insulin lispro instead of regular insulin can reduce hypoglycemia incidence and improve glycemic control.

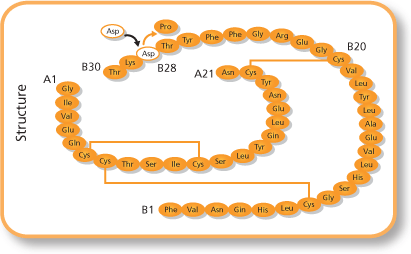
Structural formula of insulin aspart

Insulin aspart, which was approved in 2000 and is marketed under the name Novolog among others, has effects comparable to those of insulin lispro, but has a lesser risk of nocturnal hypoglycemia. It works by replacing a proline with an aspartic acid at the B28 position. Insulin glulisine has nearly identical properties to the other two short-acting analogues, but differs in the fact that the amino acid asparagine at position B3 is replaced by lysine and the lysine in position B29 is replaced by glutamic acid. It was approved in 2004 and is sold under the name Apidra.

These short-acting insulin analogues play a crucial role in modern diabetes management, as their fast onset and shorter duration of action allow for more precise postprandial glucose control. By closely mimicking endogenous insulin secretion, these analogues enhance glycemic stability, reduce post-meal blood sugar spikes, and minimize the risk of hypoglycemic events. Their pharmacokinetic properties make them particularly beneficial for individuals requiring flexible meal timing and those using intensive insulin therapy.

=== Long-acting ===
Long-acting insulin analogues are designed to provide continuous basal insulin coverage for up to 24 hours, with the exception of ultra-long-acting analogues, which work for up to a week. These include insulin glargine, insulin detemir, insulin degludec, and insulin icodec, which have been modified through amino acid substitutions and fatty acid conjugation to alter their subcutaneous absorption and extend their duration of action. A key feature of long-acting insulin analogues is reversible albumin binding and di-hexamer formation, which slow insulin dissociation and provide a more stable pharmacokinetic and pharmacodynamic profile, reducing glycemic fluctuations and nocturnal hypoglycemia.

Insulin glargine (100 U/mL), first approved by the US Food and Drug Administration (FDA) in 2000 and marketed as Lantus, forms zinc-mediated hexamer aggregates after injection, resulting in a slow insulin release. In 2015, a higher-concentration formulation (300 U/mL), marketed as Toujeo, was introduced, offering up to 36-hour coverage and a lower risk of nocturnal hypoglycemia. Insulin detemir, approved in 2005 as Levemir, features a C14 fatty acid modification at lysine B29, promoting di-hexamer formation and albumin binding for an extended duration. While effective, insulin detemir often requires twice-daily dosing for optimal glycemic control.

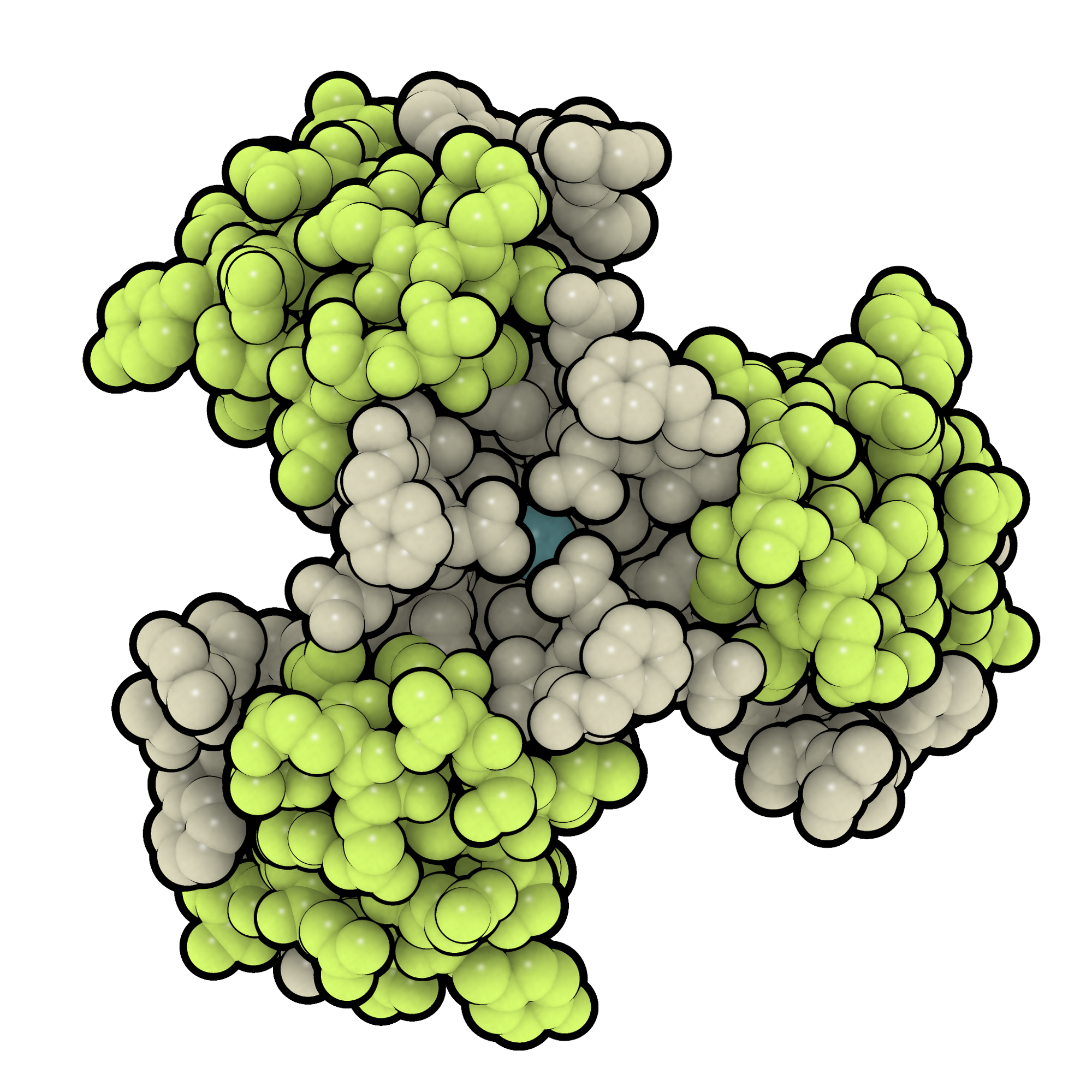
An insulin degludec hexamer. A chains are chartreuse, B chains are tan, and the central zinc atom is teal.

Insulin degludec, marketed as Tresiba and approved in 2015, is an ultra-long-acting insulin with a duration of up to 42 hours. It utilizes multi-hexamer formation and albumin binding to provide a steady insulin release with lower intra-individual variability and greater dosing flexibility. Compared to insulin glargine and detemir, degludec offers a reduced risk of nocturnal hypoglycemia and allows dosing intervals of 8 to 40 hours without compromising glycemic control. These advancements have improved diabetes management by providing more stable blood sugar control, fewer hypoglycemic episodes, and greater convenience for patients.

Insulin icodec is, as of 2025, the newest and longest-acting insulin analogue. It has a plasma half-life that is more than eight days, meaning it is a once-weekly insulin. It was approved in 2024 and is marketed as Awiqli by Novo. Insulin icodec consists of two peptide chains linked by a disulfide bridge. It contains a C20 fatty diacid-containing side chain, which facilitates strong, reversible binding to albumin. Additionally, three amino acid substitutions are introduced to enhance molecular stability, reduce insulin receptor binding, and slow clearance. These modifications collectively contribute to the prolonged half-life.

== Side effects ==
The most common side effect in all insulin analogues is low blood sugar, while in more serious cases, side effects may include low blood potassium. Insulin allergies are also a concern, although they are not prevalent, affecting only about 2% of people in some form. Insulin analogues are generally considered safe during pregnancy, and many are used in the treatment of gestational diabetes.

=== Carcinogenicity ===
All insulin analogs undergo carcinogenicity testing due to insulin's interaction with IGF (insulin-like growth factor) pathways, which can promote abnormal cell growth and tumorigenesis. Structural modifications to insulin always carry the risk of unintentionally enhancing IGF signaling, potentially increasing mitogenic activity alongside the intended pharmacological effects. Concerns have been raised specifically regarding the carcinogenic potential of insulin glargine, prompting several epidemiological studies to investigate its safety.

== Comparison with other insulins ==
=== NPH ===
Neutral Protamine Hagedorn (NPH) insulin, or isophane insulin, is an intermediate-acting insulin developed in 1946 to extend insulin activity through the addition of protamine, which slows absorption. It has an onset of about 90 minutes and lasts up to 24 hours, making it suitable for once- or twice-daily administration. NPH insulin is available as a recombinant human insulin and is sometimes premixed with short-acting insulin for combined basal and mealtime glucose control.

During the 1980s, many individuals experienced difficulties when transitioning to intermediate-acting insulins, particularly NPH formulations of porcine and bovine insulins. These issues stemmed from variability in absorption and inconsistent glucose control. In response, basal insulin analogues were developed to provide a more stable and predictable absorption profile, leading to improved clinical efficacy and glycemic management.

=== Animal-derived insulins ===
Animal insulins, including porcine and bovine insulin, were the first clinically used insulins, extracted from the pancreas of animals before the availability of biosynthetic human insulin (insulin human rDNA). Porcine insulin differs from human insulin by a single amino acid, while bovine insulin has three variations, yet both exhibit similar activity at the human insulin receptor. Prior to the introduction of biosynthetic insulin, shark-derived insulin was commonly used in Japan, and certain fish insulins were also found to be effective in humans.

While non-human insulins were widely used, they sometimes triggered allergic reactions, primarily due to impurities and preservatives in insulin preparations. Although the formation of non-neutralizing antibodies was rare, some patients experienced immune responses that affected insulin efficacy. The development of biosynthetic human insulin significantly reduced these issues, leading to its widespread adoption and largely replacing animal-derived insulin in clinical practice.

== Biosimilar insulin ==
A biosimilar is a biological medicine that is highly similar to an already approved reference biologic in terms of structure, biological activity, efficacy, and safety. These medicines are large, complex molecules produced through biotechnology in living systems, such as microorganisms, plant cells, or animal cells. Due to differences in the manufacturing process, biosimilars cannot be exact copies of reference biologics but must demonstrate high similarity through extensive structural and functional analysis. Manufacturers are required to show that a biosimilar has no clinically meaningful differences from its reference product regarding safety, purity, and potency, which is assessed through pharmacokinetic (PK) and pharmacodynamic (PD) studies, immunogenicity evaluations, and, if necessary, additional clinical studies. Biosimilars can only be developed and marketed once the patent on the original reference biologic has expired, allowing for competition and increased availability of biologic therapies.

The expiration of patents for first-generation insulin analogs has facilitated the development of biosimilar insulins, offering potential to improve global insulin access. Despite the essential role of insulin, approximately half of individuals who require it do not have access due to high costs and limited availability. This issue is particularly pronounced in low-income countries, where economic factors can restrict the use of biologic treatments such as insulin. Biosimilar insulins, which have a shorter development timeline of about eight years compared to 12 years for novel biologic drugs, provide a more affordable alternative, with development costs ranging from 10% to 20% of those for new biologics. These products could help improve access to treatment and reduce disparities in insulin availability.

The global market for biologic medicines, including insulin, grew from $46 billion in 2002 to $390 billion in 2020, accounting for 28% of the global pharmaceutical market. In the United States, biologics represented 43% of drug expenditures, totaling $211 billion in 2019, with biosimilar spending expected to rise from $5.2 billion in 2019 to nearly $27 billion by 2024. In Europe, biologics accounted for 34% of medicine spending, reaching US$78.6 billion in 2021, with the biosimilar market valued at $8.8 billion. The global human insulin market was valued at $22.9 billion in 2020, while the biosimilar insulin market stood at $2.3 billion, projected to grow to $5.6 billion by 2027. The introduction of biosimilar insulins has increased market competition, offering a cost-effective alternative that could lower treatment costs and reduce strain on healthcare systems.

Since the approval of the first biosimilar insulin, interest in the products has increased. However, uncertainty regarding their safety and efficacy has slowed their adoption among healthcare professionals. Regulatory agencies, such as the European Medicines Agency (EMA) and the US Food and Drug Administration (FDA), have established approval pathways to ensure biosimilar insulins meet the same quality, safety, and efficacy standards as reference products.

=== Available biosimilars ===
As of 2025, there are three commercially available biosimilar insulins. They are insulin glargine-yfgn, insulin glargine-aglr, and insulin aspart-szjj. Insulin glargine-yfgn is marketed under the name Semglee, and received FDA approval in July 2021, but development began before that. The approval was granted to Mylan, which was merged with another company into Viatris in 2020. The second approved biosimilar insulin, insulin glargine-aglr, was approved by the FDA in December 2021 to be produced by Lilly under the name Rezvoglar. In February 2025, the FDA approved the very first short-acting biosimilar insulin, insulin aspart szjj. It is manufactured by Viatris and sold under the name Merilog.

It is of note that although the name of insulin lispro-aabc, which is marketed as Lyumjev by Lilly, is similar to the names of biosimilars, it is not a biosimilar insulin. Insulin lispro-aabc is simply a faster formulation of insulin lispro.

== Modifications ==
Before biosynthetic human recombinant analogues became available, porcine insulin was chemically modified to create human insulin. These semisynthetic insulins were produced by altering amino acid side chains at the N-terminus and C-terminus to modify absorption, distribution, metabolism, and excretion (ADME) characteristics. Novo developed one such method by enzymatically converting porcine insulin into human insulin by replacing the single differing amino acid. Unmodified human and porcine insulins naturally form hexamers with zinc, requiring dissociation into monomers before binding to insulin receptors. This delays insulin activity when injected subcutaneously, making it less effective for postprandial glucose control.

Basal insulin analogues were developed with altered isoelectric points, allowing them to precipitate at physiological pH and dissolve slowly, providing insulin coverage for up to 24 hours. Some, like insulin detemir, bind to albumin rather than fat, prolonging their action. Non-hexameric (monomeric) insulins were later introduced for faster-acting mealtime coverage, mimicking naturally occurring monomeric insulins found in certain animal species. These advancements in insulin formulation allowed for greater flexibility in diabetes management, with basal insulin analogues providing steady background insulin levels and short-acting analogues offering improved postprandial glucose control.

Zinc-complexed insulins continued to be used for slow-release basal support, covering approximately 50% of daily insulin needs, while mealtime insulin made up the remaining half. The development of monomeric insulins addressed the limitations of hexameric formulations, ensuring faster absorption and better glycemic control. As research progressed, insulin analogues with enhanced receptor binding, extended duration, and improved stability became standard in modern diabetes treatment, reducing variability in glucose levels and lowering the risk of hypoglycemia.

== History ==
=== Early insulins (1922–1995) ===
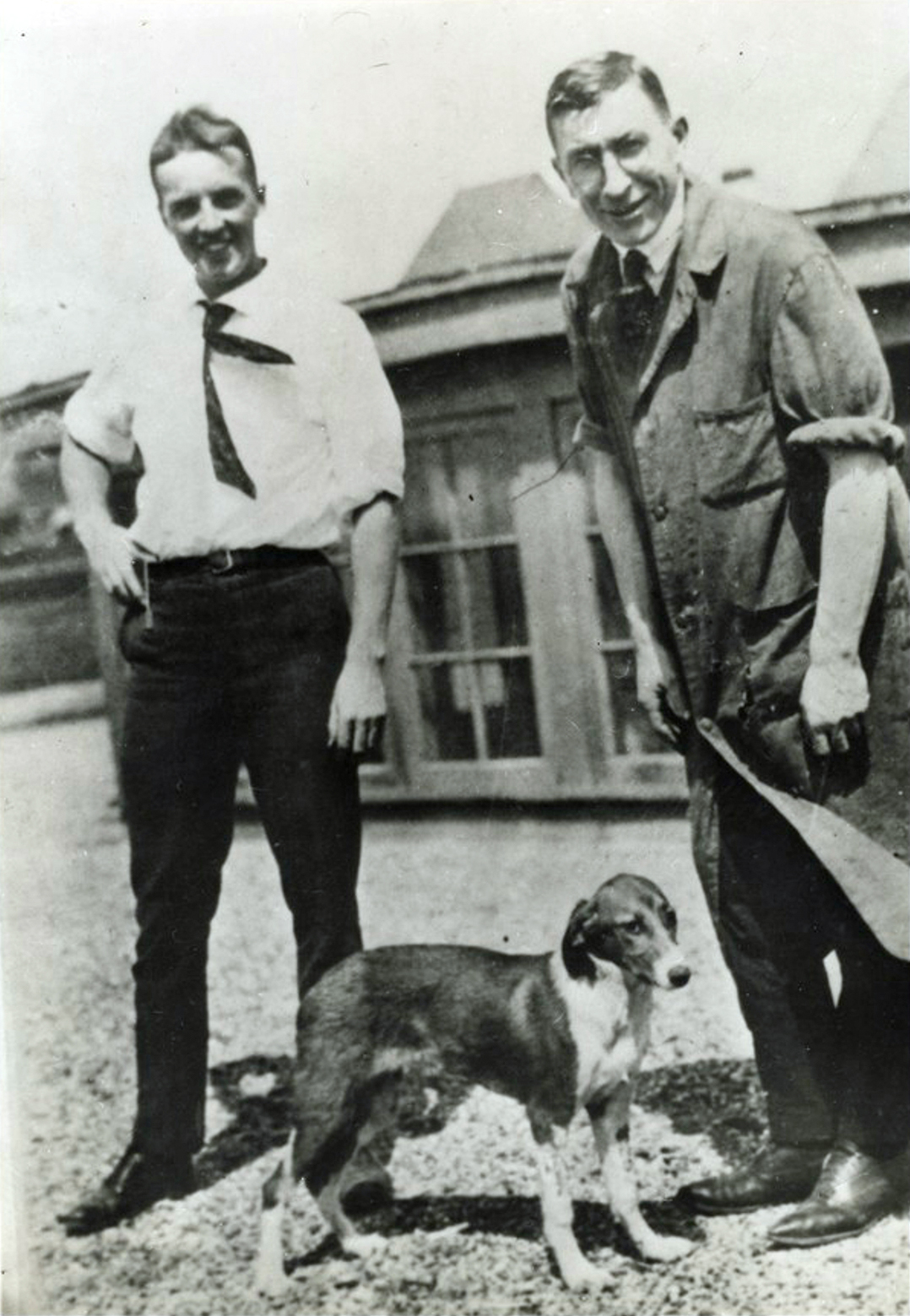
Charles Best and Frederick Banting, with one of their experimental animals, Dog 408, Toronto, August 1921.

The development of insulin therapy has progressed significantly since the early 20th century, starting with animal-derived insulins. In 1922, Frederick Banting and Charles Best successfully used bovine insulin extract to treat humans for the first time. This breakthrough led to the commercial production of bovine insulin in 1923 by Eli Lilly and Company. That same year, Hans Christian Hagedorn founded the Nordisk Insulinlaboratorium in Denmark, which later became Novo. In 1926, Nordisk received a Danish charter to produce insulin as a non-profit entity. In 1936, Canadian researchers D.M. Scott and A.M. Fisher developed a zinc insulin mixture, which was licensed to Novo. During this time, Hagedorn discovered that adding protamine to insulin could prolong its action, which led to the development of Neutral Protamine Hagedorn (NPH) insulin in 1946. NPH insulin was marketed by Nordisk in 1950. By 1953, Novo also developed Lente insulin by adding zinc to porcine and bovine insulins, resulting in a longer-acting form.

A significant advancement in insulin production occurred in 1978 when Genentech developed the biosynthesis of recombinant human insulin using Escherichia coli bacteria and recombinant DNA technology. This allowed for the production of insulin identical to that produced by the human pancreas. In 1981, Novo chemically and enzymatically converted porcine insulin into human insulin. Genentech's synthetic human insulin, produced in partnership with Eli Lilly, was approved by the U.S. Food and Drug Administration in 1982. Lilly's biosynthetic recombinant insulin, branded as Humulin, was introduced in 1983. In 1985, Axel Ullrich sequenced the human insulin receptor, further enhancing the understanding of insulin's biological mechanisms. By 1988, Novo produced synthetic recombinant human insulin, which further improved insulin availability and consistency.

=== Initial analogue development (1996–2014) ===
The development of insulin analogues began with Humalog (insulin lispro), a short-acting insulin analogue developed by Eli Lilly, which was approved by the FDA in 1996. Humalog was designed to be absorbed more quickly than regular insulin, offering improved flexibility in meal timing and postprandial glucose control. In 2000, Lantus (insulin glargine) was approved by the FDA and the European Medicines Agency (EMA). Lantus is a long-acting insulin analogue designed to provide a steady basal level of insulin throughout the day, typically lasting up to 24 hours, thereby reducing the need for multiple daily injections. In 2004, Apidra (insulin glulisine), another short-acting insulin analog, was approved by Sanofi-Aventis to improve postprandial glucose control.

In 2005, Levemir (insulin detemir), developed by Novo, was approved for clinical use. Levemir is a long-acting insulin analogue similar to Lantus but with a slightly shorter duration of action. It provides stable basal insulin coverage with a reduced risk of hypoglycemia compared to older insulins.

=== Modern analogues (2015–present) ===
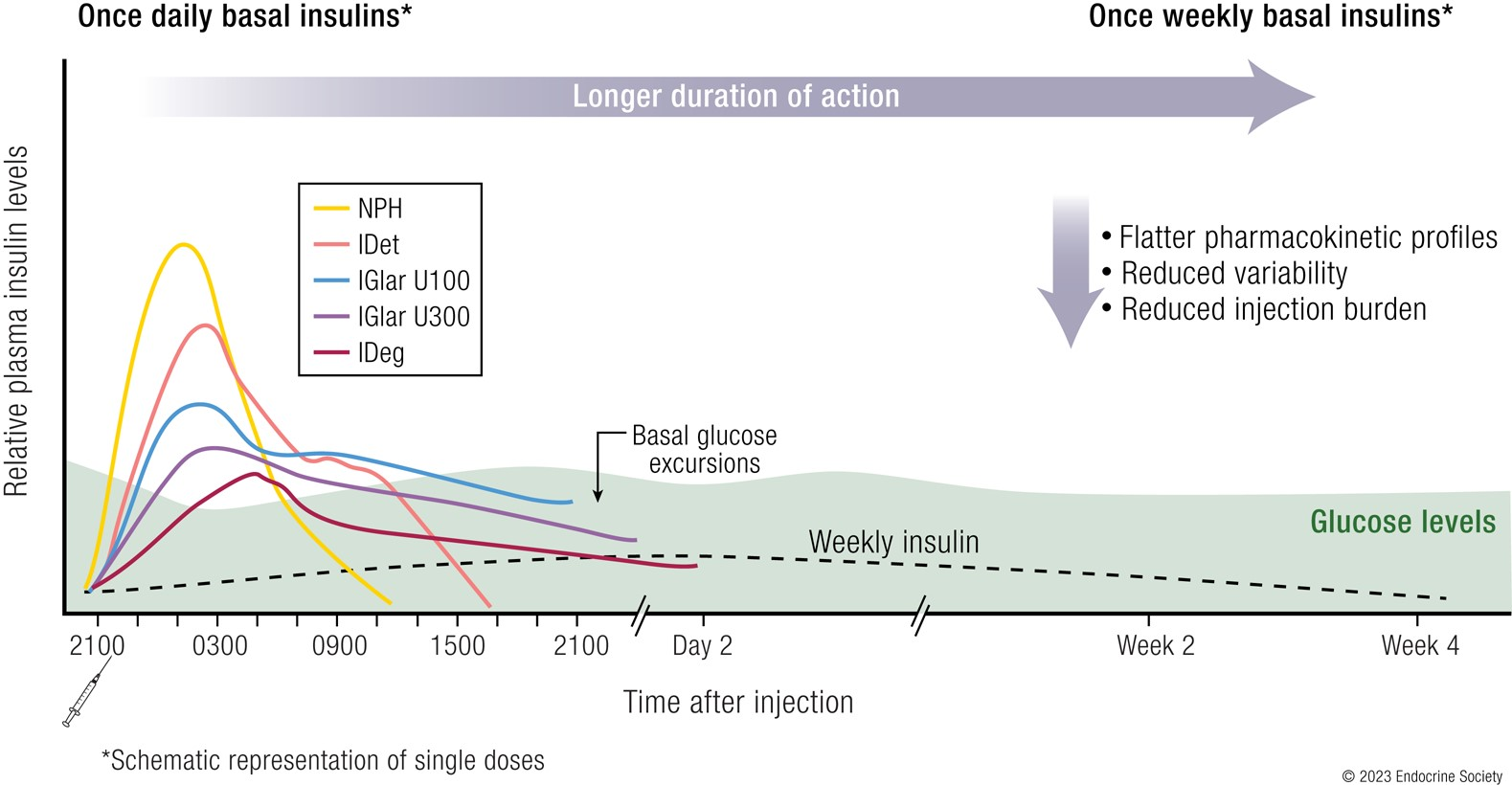
Pharmacokinetic comparison between daily insulins and once weekly icodec insulin

As of 2025, many companies are researching and manufacturing new insulin analogues. These insulins are usually designed to be either ultra-short-acting or ultra-long-acting. Insulin degludec, an ultra-long-acting insulin analog, was developed by Novo and approved by the FDA in 2015. Insulin degludec has an extended duration of action, lasting up to 42 hours, offering greater flexibility in dosing schedules.

In March 2024, insulin icodec was approved for medical use in Canada. The same month, the Committee for Medicinal Products for Human Use (CHMP) of the European Medicines Agency (EMA) issued a positive opinion, recommending the granting of marketing authorization for Awiqli, under which insulin icodec is marketed. Following the CHMP's recommendation, insulin icodec was approved for medical use in the European Union in May 2024. Insulin icodec has a plasma half-life more than eight days (compared to 25 hours of the previous longest-acting insulin analogue insulin degludec), making it a once-weekly basal insulin.

==== Experimental analogues ====
Insulin tregopil is an experimental ultra-fast-acting insulin that is being developed by Biocon. Unlike other insulin analogues, it is designed to be taken orally. It has been modified with the covalent attachment of a methoxy-triethylene-glycol-propionyl moiety at Lys-β29-amino group of the B-chain. This modification, along with the use of sodium caprate as a permeation enhancer, allows insulin tregopil to be absorbed through the gastrointestinal tract. Another oral analogue called ORMD-0801 is, as of 2025, in development by Oramed Pharmaceuticals.

Insulin efsitora alfa is an experimental insulin analogue developed by Eli Lilly for the treatment of diabetes. Its glycemic control and safety were found to be similar to insulin degludec in a phase II clinical trial.

NNC2215 is a bioengineered glucose-sensitive insulin analogue developed by Novo researchers. The drug is designed to adjust its activity based on blood glucose levels, reducing insulin sensitivity when glucose concentrations are low, thereby lowering the risk of hypoglycemia. It also provides more stable blood sugar control by responding dynamically to fluctuations in glucose levels. A study on NNC2215 was published in the journal Nature on 16 October 2024, describing its potential as a major advancement in diabetes treatment and the role of protein engineering in future medicine. The development of glucose-sensitive insulin has been an area of interest in diabetes research since 1979, aiming to address blood sugar fluctuations. Several previous attempts have been made to create glucose-responsive insulin, with varying degrees of success.

In the 2010s, Eli Lilly and Company developed an experimental basal insulin analogue called peglispro (BIL), which showed a prolonged and flat activity profile with hepato-preferential action. Although BIL demonstrated improved glycemic control, reduced nocturnal hypoglycemia, and less weight gain compared to insulin glargine, it was associated with increased liver fat, triglycerides, and liver enzyme levels. Due to these concerns and the uncertain regulatory pathway, Lilly discontinued the development of BIL in 2015.

Other experimental analogues that are in development include LAPS Insulin115, an ultralong analogue being researched by Hanmi Pharm, and two basal oral analogues in development by Novo, OI338 and OI320.

=== Approval overview ===
Since 1996, seven novel insulin analogues have been approved. Three short-acting and four long-acting analogues have been made, while one short-acting lispro modification has been produced. Since 2021, three insulin biosimilars have been approved, two of which are long-acting and one of which is short-acting.

- 1996: Insulin lispro, which was originally manufactured by Eli Lilly and Company, is granted approval.
- 2000: Insulin aspart, which was created by Novo, is approved.
- 2000: Insulin glargine, which was developed by Sanofi-Aventis, is approved.
- 2004: Insulin glulisine, also developed by Sanofi-Aventis, is approved.
- 2005: Insulin detemir, which was formulated by Novo, gets approval.
- 2015: Insulin degludec, created by Novo, is approved.
- 2020: Insulin lispro-aabc, a faster insulin lispro formulation created by Eli Lilly and Company, is approved.
- 2021: Insulin glargine-yfgn, the first approved insulin biosimilar, which is produced by Viatris, is approved.
- 2021: Insulin glargine-aglr, a biosimilar produced by Eli Lilly and Company, is granted approval.
- 2024: Insulin icodec, the newest commercially available analogue by Novo, gets approval.
- 2025: Insulin aspart-szjj, the first short-acting biosimilar, created by Viatris, is approved.

=== Unapproved analogues overview ===
Many experimental insulin analogues are being developed to improve diabetes treatment. These include new injectable types and oral forms. Oral insulin is being studied as a way to avoid injections and better match natural insulin delivery.

- Insulin tregopil, in development by Biocon
- Insulin efsitora alfa, made by Lilly
- ORMD-0801, an oral analogue produced by Oramed
- NNC2215, a glucose-sensitive insulin being researched by Novo
- OI338 and OI320, two basal oral analogues also by Novo
- LAPS Insulin115, an ultralong analogue being researched by Hanmi Pharm

== Research ==
The Canadian Agency for Drugs and Technologies in Health (CADTH) conducted a 2008 comparison of insulin analogues and biosynthetic human insulin, concluding that insulin analogues did not demonstrate any clinically significant differences in terms of glycemic control or adverse reaction profiles.

=== Comparative effectiveness ===
A meta-analysis conducted in 2007 and updated in 2020 by the international Cochrane Collaboration, which reviewed numerous randomized controlled trials, found that treatment with glargine and detemir insulins resulted in fewer cases of hypoglycemia compared to NPH insulin. Additionally, treatment with detemir was associated with a reduction in the frequency of severe hypoglycemia. However, the review acknowledged limitations, such as the use of low glucose and Hemoglobin A1c targets, which could affect the generalizability of these findings to routine clinical practice.

In 2007, a report from Germany's Institute for Quality and Cost Effectiveness in the Health Care Sector (IQWiG) concluded that there was insufficient evidence to support the superiority of short-acting insulin analogues over synthetic human insulin for the treatment of adult patients with type 1 diabetes. Many of the studies reviewed were criticized for being too small to provide statistically reliable results, and notably, none were blinded.

== See also ==
- List of commercially available insulins
- Selenoinsulin
