= List of commercially available insulins =

The relative effectiveness of each insulin analogue over time

Insulin as a medication is sold under many different trade names, which are listed below. A dagger symbol (†) indicates discontinued brands. Different brands of insulin may offer any of the following preparation methods: vials, pens, cartridges, IV bags or inhalers.

All insulin analogues and non-analogue insulins work by enhancing glucose uptake in tissues and reducing glucose production by the liver. Insulin is prescribed for conditions such as type 1 diabetes, type 2 diabetes, gestational diabetes, and diabetes-related complications such as diabetic ketoacidosis. Additionally, insulin is administered alongside glucose to treat elevated blood potassium levels (hyperkalemia).

While all types are commonly referred to as insulin, the term in its strictest sense applies to the naturally occurring molecule, whereas insulin analogues have modified structures to alter their pharmacokinetics.

Certain insulin brands can also have differing names regionally, such as how Novolog is called Novorapid outside of the United States. Brands may also be commonly referred to with different names. For example, Basaglar, Abasaglar, and Abasria all refer to the same brand. Abasria is the brand's former name, while Basaglar and Abasaglar are regional.

The three companies which produce the most insulin are Lilly, Novo Nordisk and Sanofi. These corporations control 99% of the global market by value and 96% by volume. However, other smaller pharmaceutical companies also produce insulin, such as Mannkind (Afrezza), Viatris (Semglee), Lupin (Lupisulin), Baxter (Myxredlin), Biocon (Basalog), Darou Pakhsh (Dipisulin), Glenmark (Insulong), Wockhardt (Wosulin), Julphar (Jusline), SciGen (SciLin), Bioton (Gensulin), and Cadila (Humanext). Many insulin analogues are available unbranded.

== Rapid-acting ==
=== Insulin lispro ===
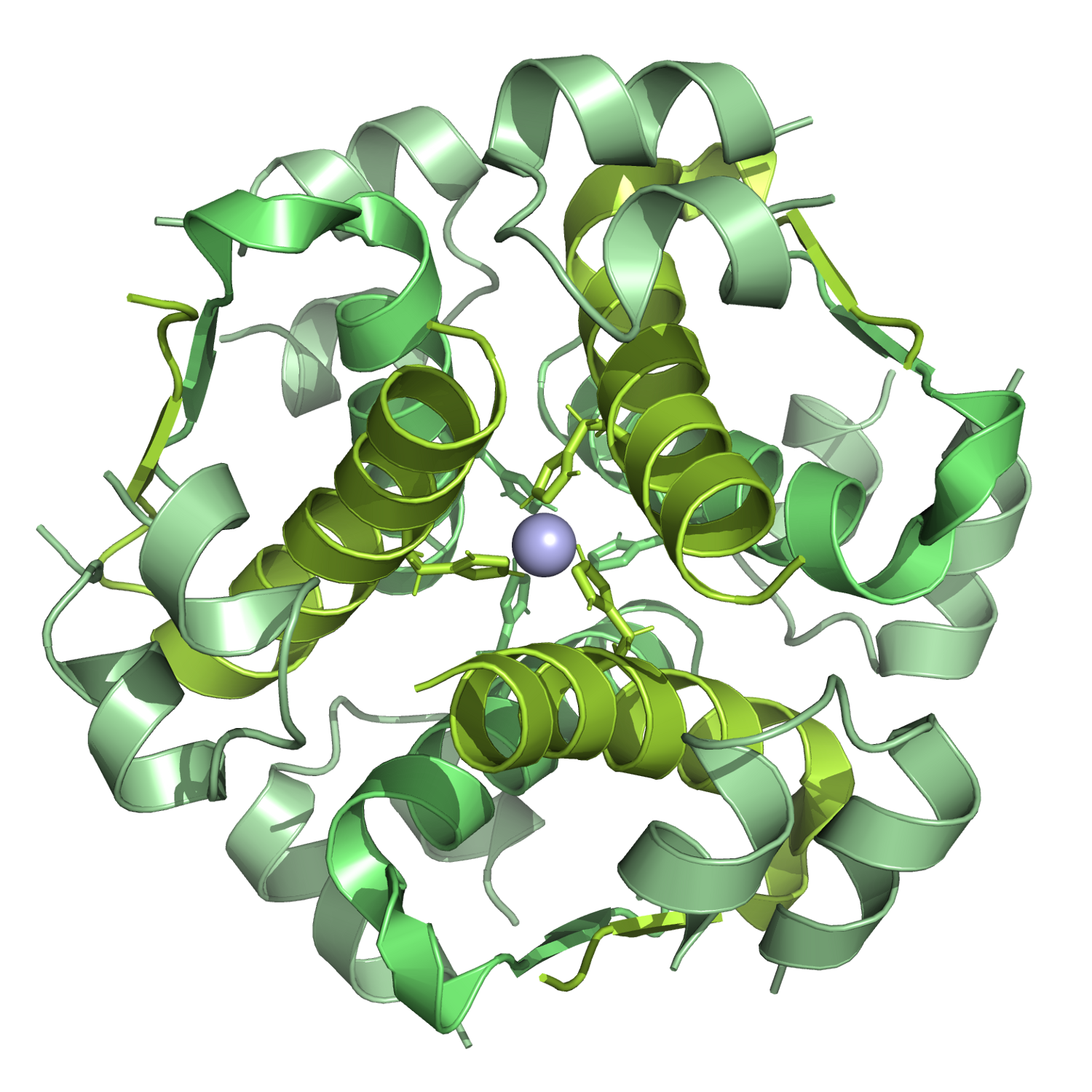
Insulin lispro hexamer

Insulin lispro, marketed under the brand name Humalog among others, is a modified form of medical insulin used to treat both type 1 and type 2 diabetes. It is administered subcutaneously through injection or an insulin pump. The effects typically begin within 30 minutes and last for about 5 hours. Sometimes, a longer-acting insulin, such as insulin NPH, is also used.

Common side effects include low blood sugar, while more serious side effects may include low blood potassium. It is generally considered safe for use during pregnancy and breastfeeding. It functions similarly to human insulin by increasing glucose uptake in tissues and reducing the amount of glucose produced by the liver in gluconeogenesis.

Insulin lispro was first approved for use in the United States in 1996. It is a synthetic analogue of human insulin, created by swapping two amino acids. In 2022, it ranked as the 70th most commonly prescribed medication in the United States, with over 9 million prescriptions. Insulin lispro is available under a generic label from Lilly.

Insulin lispro brands
Brand Name	Manufacturer	Preparation method(s)	Image	References
Admelog	Sanofi	Vial, pen	vial of admelog insulin	
Humalog	Lilly	Vial, cartridge, pen	vial of Humalog insulin buried in sugar	
Liprolog	Lilly	Vial, cartridge pen		
Lyumjev	Lilly	Vial, pen		

=== Insulin aspart ===
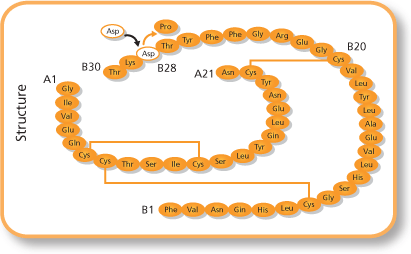
Structural formula of insulin aspart

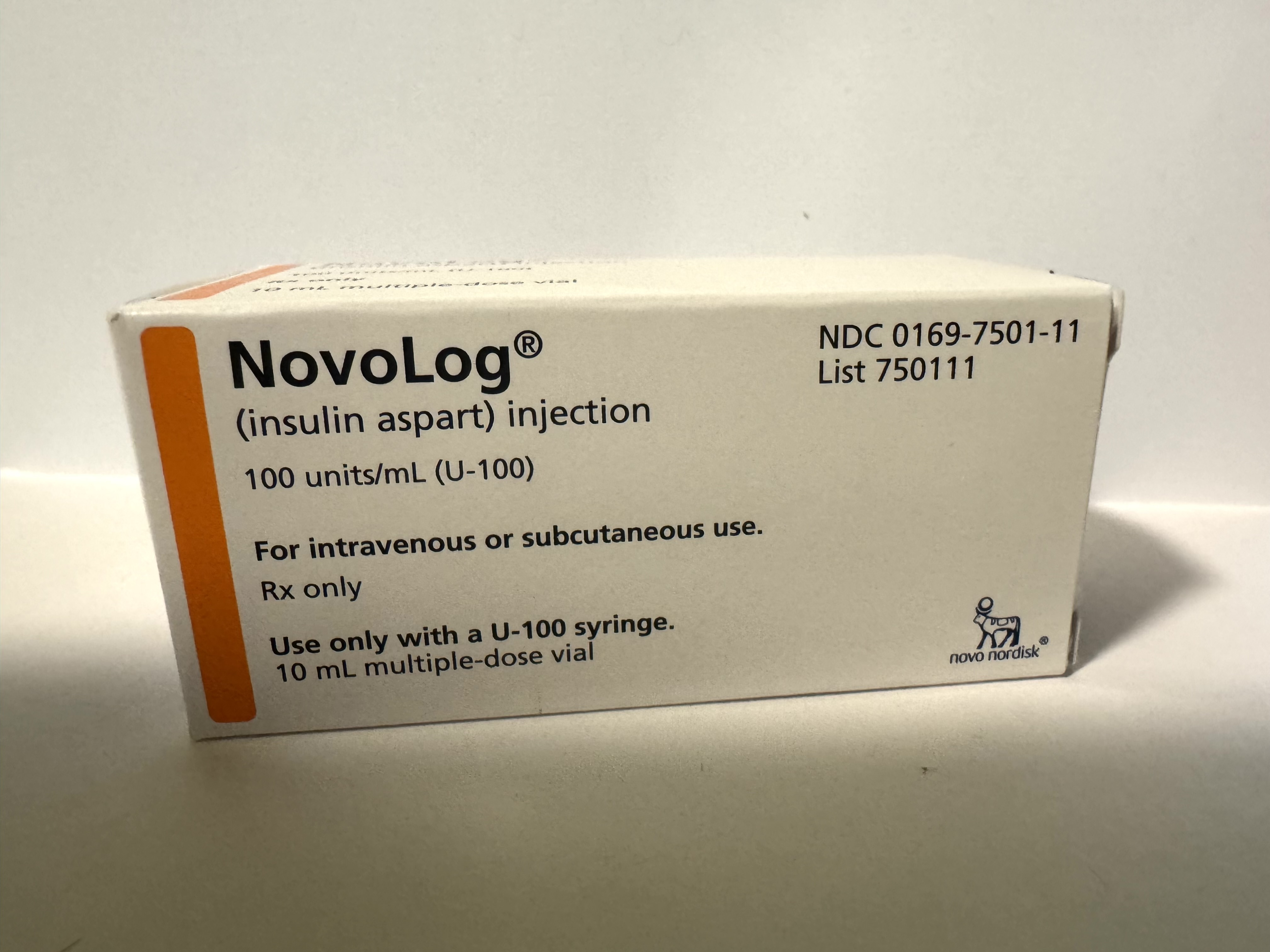
Insulin brands usually do not have true logos, and most packaging design is simple

Insulin aspart, marketed under the brand name Novolog among others, is a modified type of medical insulin used to treat both type 1 and type 2 diabetes. It is typically administered by injection under the skin (into the abdomen, buttocks, thighs, or upper arms), but can also be injected into a vein. Its maximum effect occurs after about 1–3 hours and lasts for 3–5 hours. A biosimilar version of insulin aspart, insulin-aspart-szjj, was released in 2025.

Common side effects include low blood sugar, allergic reactions, itchiness, and pain at the injection site. Serious side effects may include low blood potassium. It is generally considered safe to use during pregnancy and breastfeeding. It works similarly to human insulin by enhancing glucose uptake in tissues and reducing glucose production by the liver. It is a synthetic form of human insulin, with a single amino acid change, replacing proline with aspartic acid at the B28 position.

Insulin aspart was approved for medical use in the United States in 2000. In 2022, it was the 76th most commonly prescribed medication in the United States, with over 8 million prescriptions. Its production involves yeast that have had the gene for insulin aspart inserted into their genome, allowing the yeast to produce the insulin, which is then harvested from the bioreactor. Insulin aspart is available unbranded from Novo Nordisk.

Insulin aspart brands
Brand Name	Manufacturer	Preparation method(s)	Image	References
Fiasp	Novo Nordisk	Vial, cartridge, pen		
Novolog/Novorapid	Novo Nordisk	Vial, cartridge, pen	uncapped orange insulin pen labelled Novorapid	
Trurapi	Sanofi	Vial, cartridge, pen		
Kirsty	Viatris	Pen		
Merilog	Sanofi	Pen		

=== Insulin glulisine ===
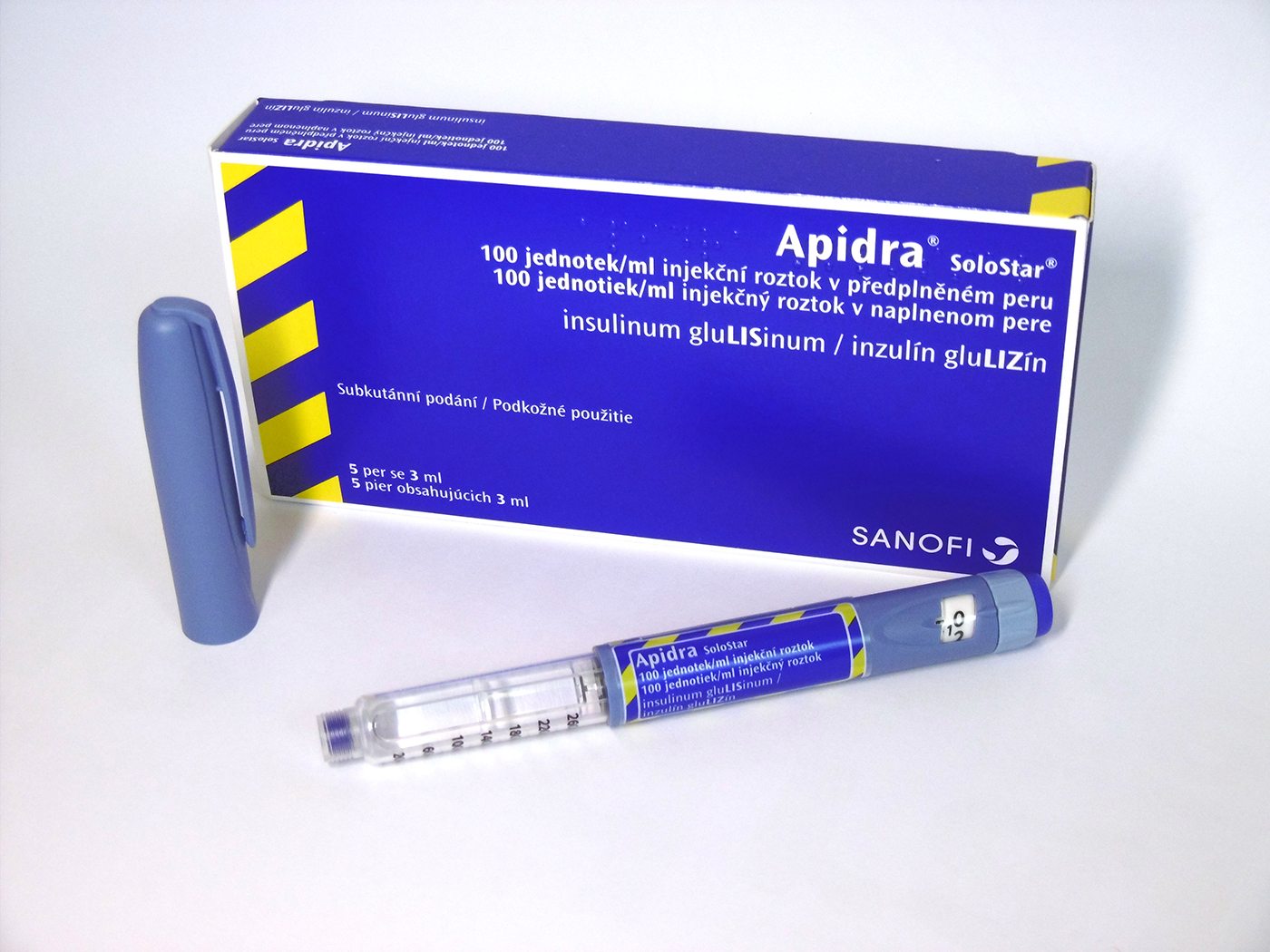
Apidra pen and box

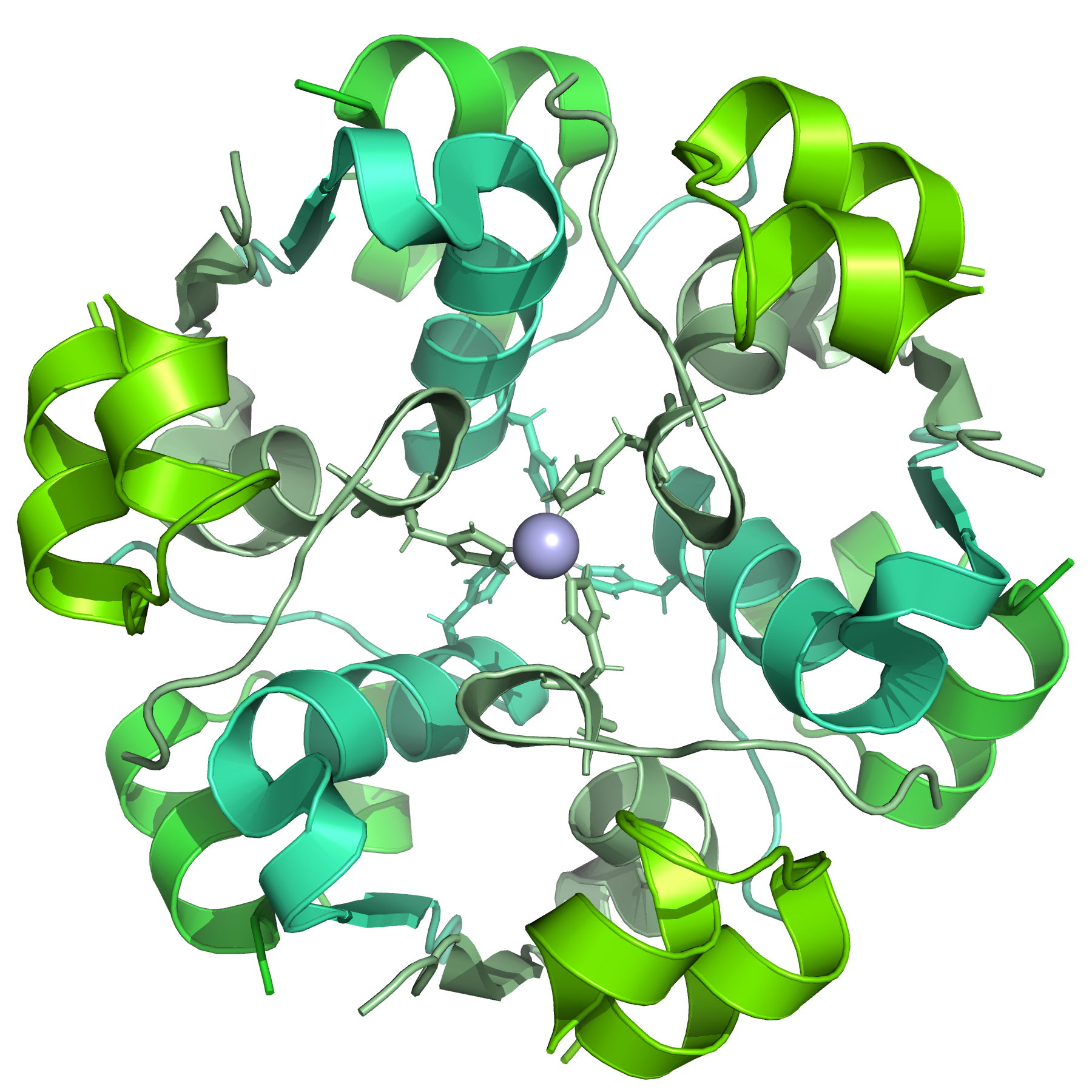
A model of insulin glulisine

Insulin glulisine is a rapid-acting modified form of insulin used to treat diabetes. It differs from human insulin by replacing the amino acid asparagine at position B3 with lysine and the lysine at position B29 with glutamic acid. When injected subcutaneously, it enters the bloodstream faster than regular human insulin (RHI). It was developed by Sanofi. The most common side effect is hypoglycemia (low blood glucose levels).

Insulin glulisine was approved for medical use in the United States and the European Union in 2004. It is currently patented by Sanofi, and is therefore only produced by said company under the brand name Apidra.

=== Inhalable insulin ===
Inhalable insulin, also known as technosphere insulin, is a powdered form of insulin, delivered with an inhaler into the lungs where it is absorbed. In general, inhaled insulins have been more rapidly absorbed than subcutaneous injected insulin, with faster peak concentration in serum and more rapid metabolism.

Exubera, developed by Inhale Therapeutics (later named Nektar Therapeutics), became the first inhaled insulin product to be marketed, in 2006 by Pfizer, but poor sales led Pfizer to withdraw it in 2007. Afrezza, a monomeric inhaled, ultra rapid-acting insulin developed by Mannkind, was approved by the FDA in 2014 and is the only inhaled insulin commercialized as of 2025.

Inhalable insulin brands
Brand Name	Manufacturer	Preparation method(s)	References
Afrezza	Mannkind	Inhaler	
Exubera†	Pfizer	Inhaler	

== Short-acting ==
=== Regular insulin ===
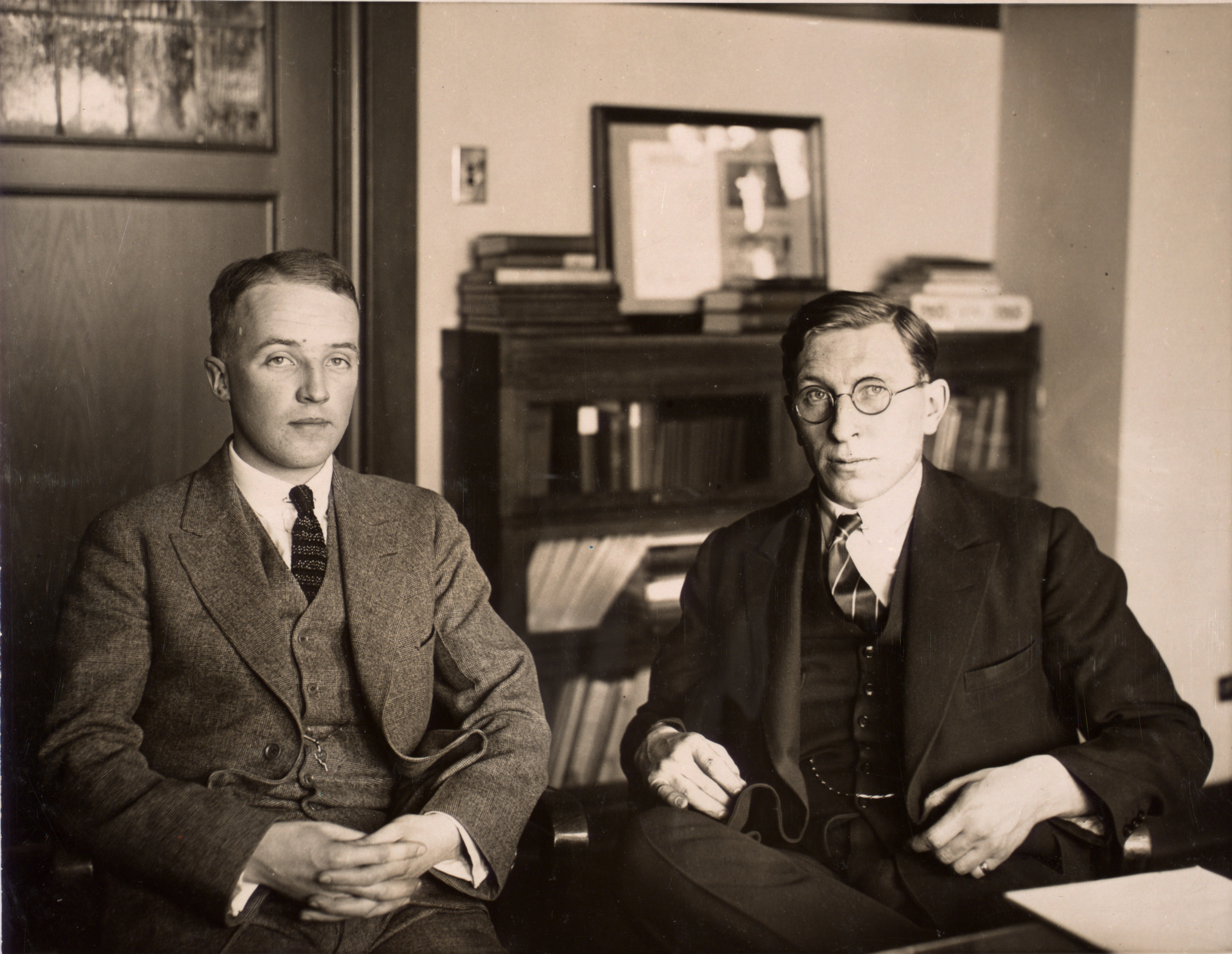
Photograph of Charles Best and Frederick Banting, the inventors of insulin

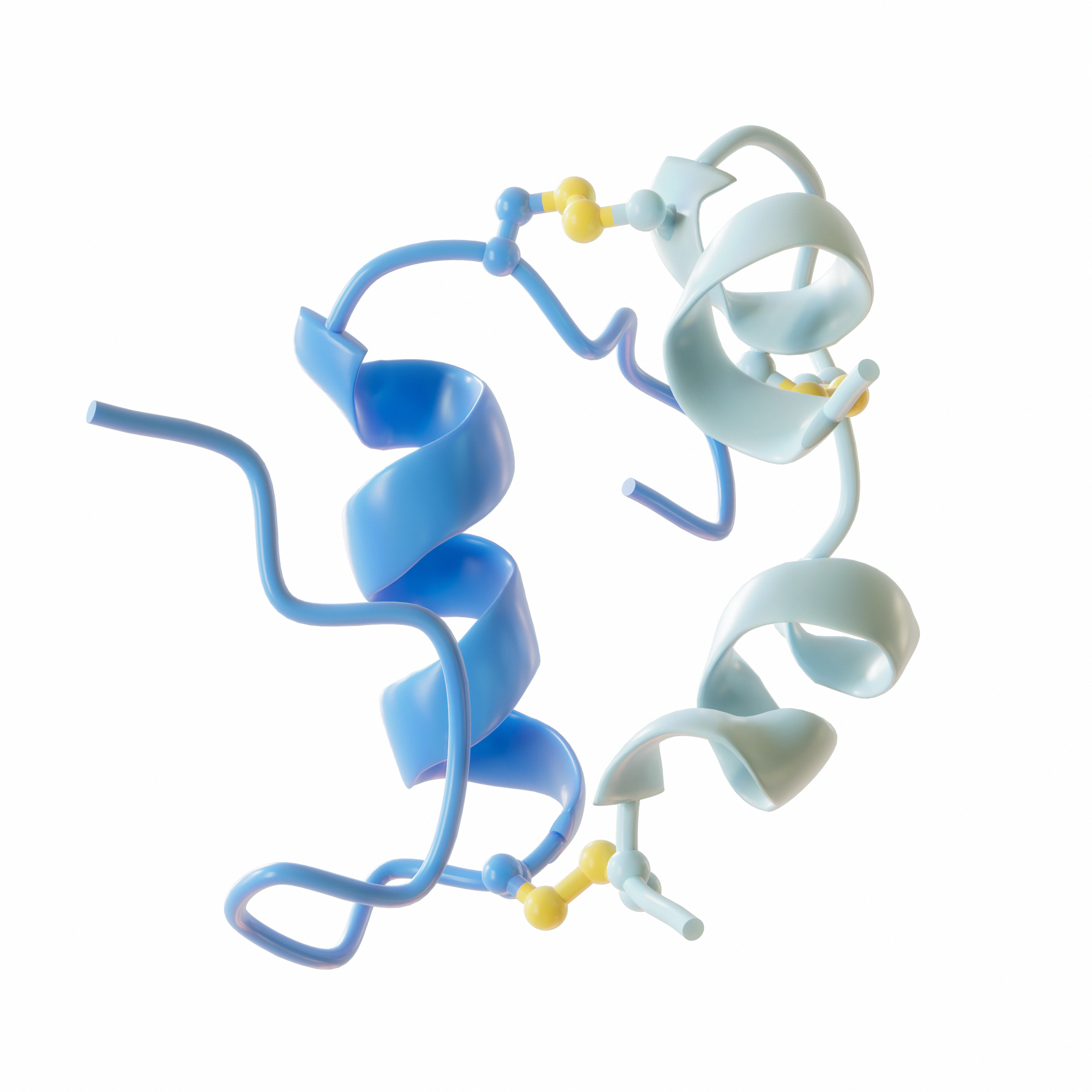
Insulin monomer

Regular insulin, also known as neutral insulin or soluble insulin, is a type of short-acting medical insulin. It is used to treat type 1 diabetes, type 2 diabetes, gestational diabetes, and complications such as diabetic ketoacidosis and hyperosmolar hyperglycemic states. It is also used with glucose to treat high blood potassium levels. Typically administered by injection under the skin, it can also be injected into a vein or muscle. Its effects usually begin within one hour and last around four hours.

The most common side effect is low blood sugar. Other side effects may include pain or skin changes at the injection sites, low blood potassium, and allergic reactions. It is relatively safe to use during pregnancy for the baby. Regular insulin can be derived from the pancreas of pigs or cows, with human versions created by modifying pig insulin or using recombinant technology.

Insulin was first used as a medication in Canada by Charles Best and Frederick Banting in 1922. It is listed on the World Health Organization's List of Essential Medicines. In 2017, it ranked as the 209th most commonly prescribed medication in the United States, with over 2 million prescriptions. There are also versions available that are mixed with longer-acting insulin, such as NPH insulin. In 2020, the combination of human insulin and insulin isophane was the 246th most commonly prescribed medication in the US, with more than 2 million prescriptions.

Regular insulin is commonly sold under the name of an insulin product line followed by the letter R.

Regular insulin brands
Brand Name	Manufacturer	Preparation method(s)	Image	References
Humulin R	Lily	Vial, pen	a vial labelled humalin R	
Novolin R	Novo Nordisk	Vial		
Myxredlin	Baxter	IV bags		
Insuman R†	Sanofi	Vial, pen		
Ronulin R	Ronak	Vial		
Lupisulin R	Lupin	Vial, cartridge		
Actrapid	Novo Nordisk	Vial, cartridge, pen	a cartridge labelled Actrapid containing a clear liquid	
Insugen R	Biocon	Vial, cartridge		
Monotard†	Novo Nordisk	Vial		
Dipisulin R	Darou Pakhsh	Vial		
Huminsulin R	Lupin	Vial		
Human Insulong	Glenmark	Vial		
Univia R	Pfizer	Vial		
Wosulin R	Wockhardt	Vial		
Jusline R	Julphar	Vial		
Gensulin R	Bioton	Cartridge		
SciLin R	SciGen	Vial, cartridge		

=== Semilente insulin ===
Semilente insulin was an insulin from the lente family of insulin that was derived from pork. It had smaller crystals than untralente, so it was absorbed faster, and therefore had a shorter duration of action which was similar to that of regular insulin. Like the other lente insulins, it was phased out in the early 2000s. It was produced by Lilly under the name Semilente Iletin I.

=== Buffered regular insulin ===
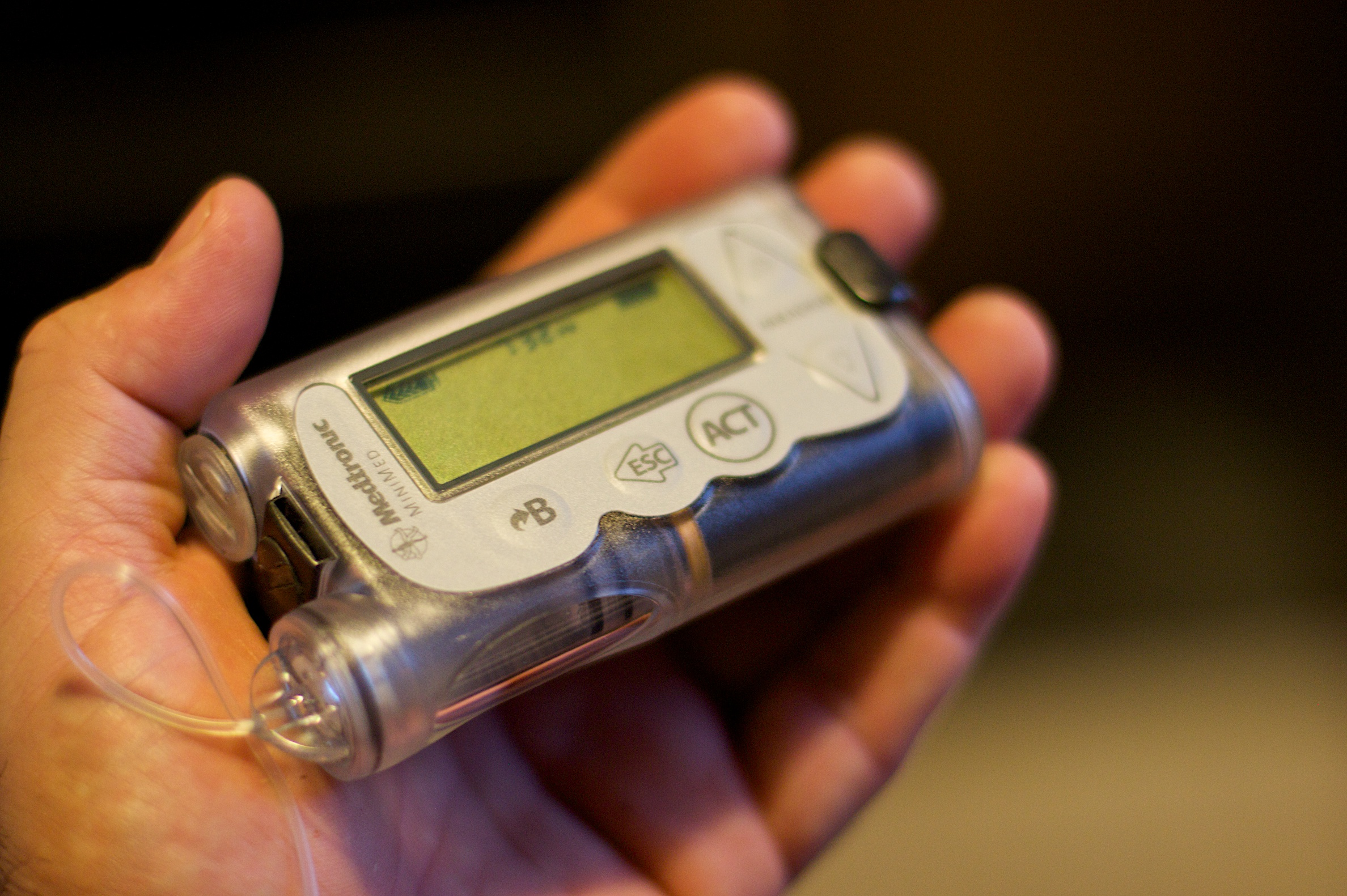
An insulin pump, which no longer requires specialized insulin

Buffered regular insulin is a variation of regular insulin that is specifically formulated for use only in insulin pumps.

Buffered regular insulin brands
Brand Name	Manufacturer	Preparation method(s)	References
Humulin BR†	Lilly	Vial	
Velosulin BR†	Novo Nordisk	Vial	

== Intermediate-acting ==
=== NPH insulin ===
NPH insulin, also known as isophane insulin, is an intermediate-acting insulin used to manage blood sugar levels in individuals with diabetes. The name NPH is an abbreviation for "neutral protamine Hagedorn", referring to neutral pH (pH = 7), protamine a protein attached to the insulin molecule, and Hans Christian Hagedorn, the insulin researcher who developed this formulation. It was designed to enhance insulin delivery and is one of the early examples of engineered drug delivery.

It is typically administered through subcutaneous injection once or twice daily. Its effects usually begin within an hour and last for 24 hours. There are versions available that are premixed with short-acting insulins, such as regular insulin. The most common side effect is low blood sugar (hypoglycemia). Other potential side effects may include pain or skin changes at the injection sites, low blood potassium, and allergic reactions. It is generally considered safe for use during pregnancy for the fetus. NPH insulin is produced by mixing regular insulin and protamine in precise proportions with zinc and phenol to maintain a neutral pH and form crystals. There are versions based on human and pig insulin.

Protamine insulin was first created in 1936, and NPH insulin was introduced in 1946. It is included in the World Health Organization's List of Essential Medicines In 2020, insulin isophane was the 221st most commonly prescribed medication in the United States, with more than 2 million prescriptions.

NPH insulin is commonly sold under the name of an insulin product line followed by the letter N.

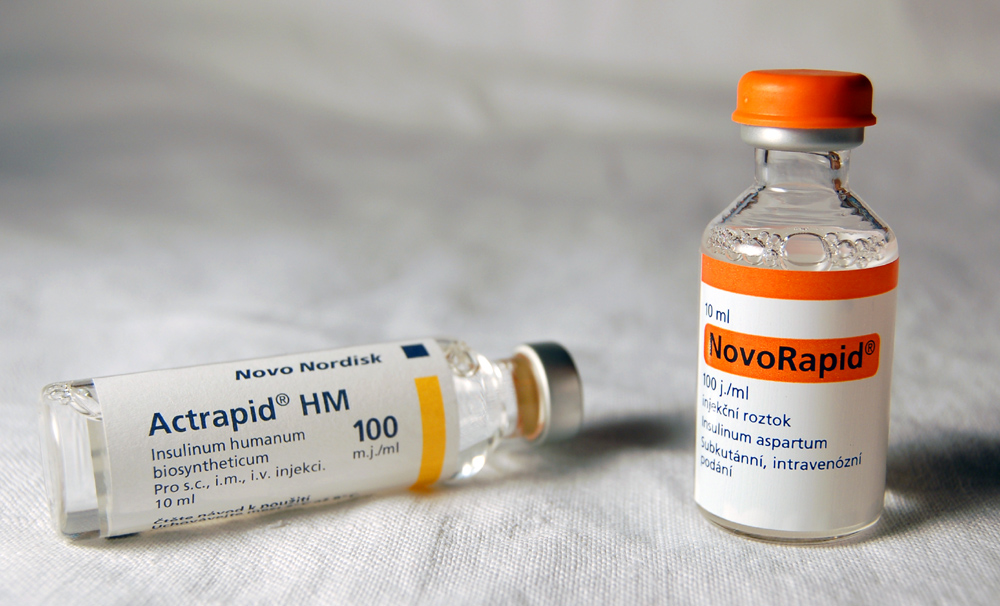
Vials

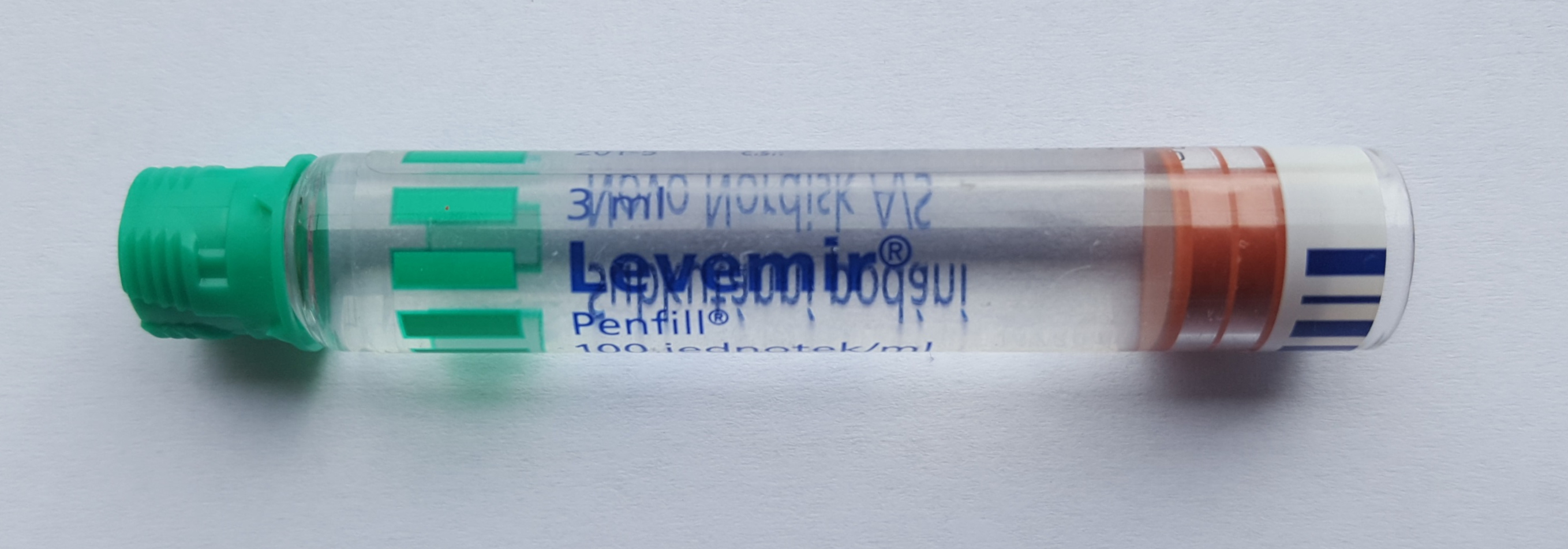
Cartridges

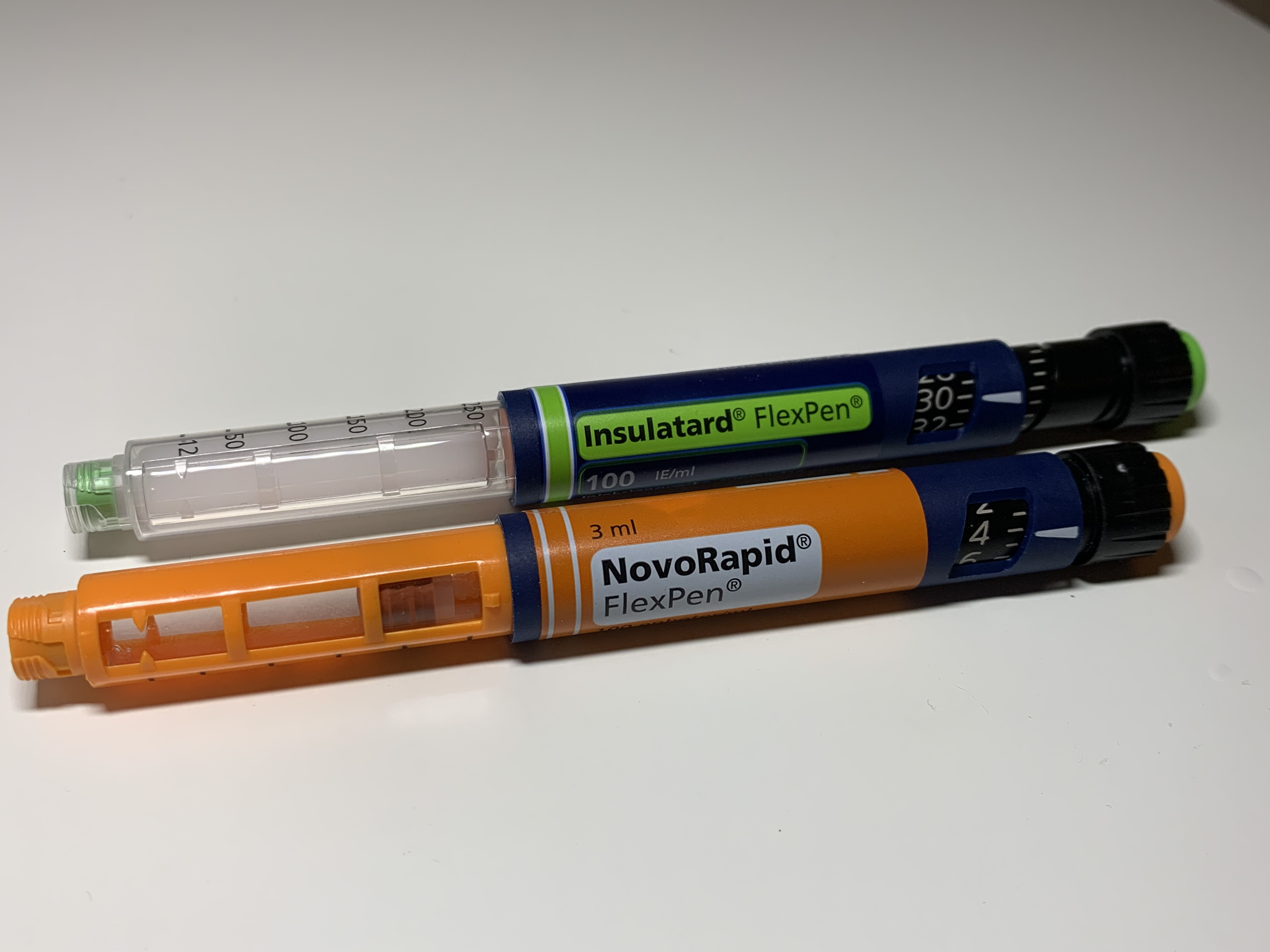
Pens

Insulins can come in varying preparation methods, depending on the brand. These include vials, pens, cartridges, inhalers, and IV bags.

NPH insulin brands
Brand Name	Manufacturer	Preparation method(s)	Image	References
Novolin N	Novo Nordisk	Vial, pen		
Humulin N	Lilly	Vial, pen		
Insulatard	Novo Nordisk	Vial, pen	An uncapped injector pen labelled Insulatard	
Insuman Basal†	Sanofi	Vial, pen		
Actraphane	Novo Nordisk	Vial, pen		
Ronulin N	Ronak	Vial		
Lupisulin N	Lupin	Vial, Cartridge		
Insugen N	Biocon	Vial, Cartridge		
Dipusulin N	Darou Pakhsh	Vial	a syringe with an orange cap laying on a table next to a vial with a green label	
Huminsulin N	Lupin	Vial		
Humanext N	Cadila	Vial		
Wosulin N	Wockhardt	Vial		
Lentard	Novo Nordisk	Vial		
Jusline N	Julphar	Vial		
Gensulin N	Bioton	Cartridge		
SciLin N	SciGen	Vial, cartridge		
Protaphane	Novo Nordisk	Vial		

=== Lente insulin ===
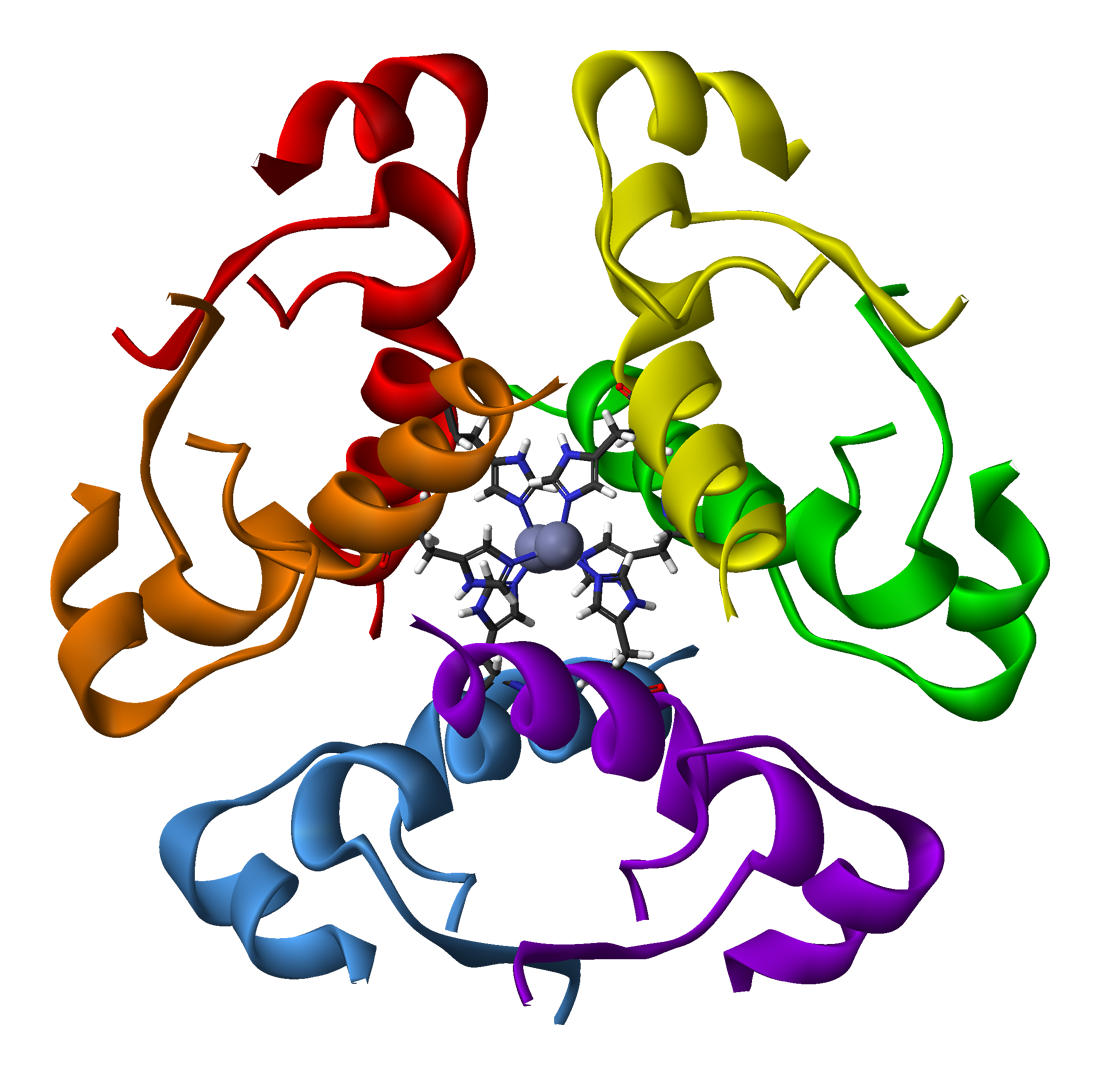
Insulin hexamer with a cetral zinc atom (lente)

Lente insulin (derived from the Italian word lento, meaning "slow"), also known as insulin zinc suspension, was an intermediate-acting insulin that is no longer used in humans. Its effects begin one to two hours after administration, with peak activity occurring approximately 8 to 12 hours post-injection, and some residual effects lasting beyond 24 hours.

Manufacturers discontinued Lente insulin and other similar insulin analogs in the mid-2000s, and it is no longer approved for human use in the United States. This decision was partly due to the medical community's preference for more predictable insulin formulations, such as recombinant NPH insulin.

Similarly to the modern brands of NPH and regular insulin, which are still sold, lente insulins would be marketed under the name of the rest of the insulins in a brand's product line, followed by the letter L.

Lente insulin brands
Brand Name	Manufacturer	Preparation method(s)	References
Humulin L†	Lilly	Vial, cartridge	
Novolin L†	Novo Nordisk	Vial, cartridge	
Iletin†	Lilly	Vial	

== Long-acting ==
=== Insulin detemir ===
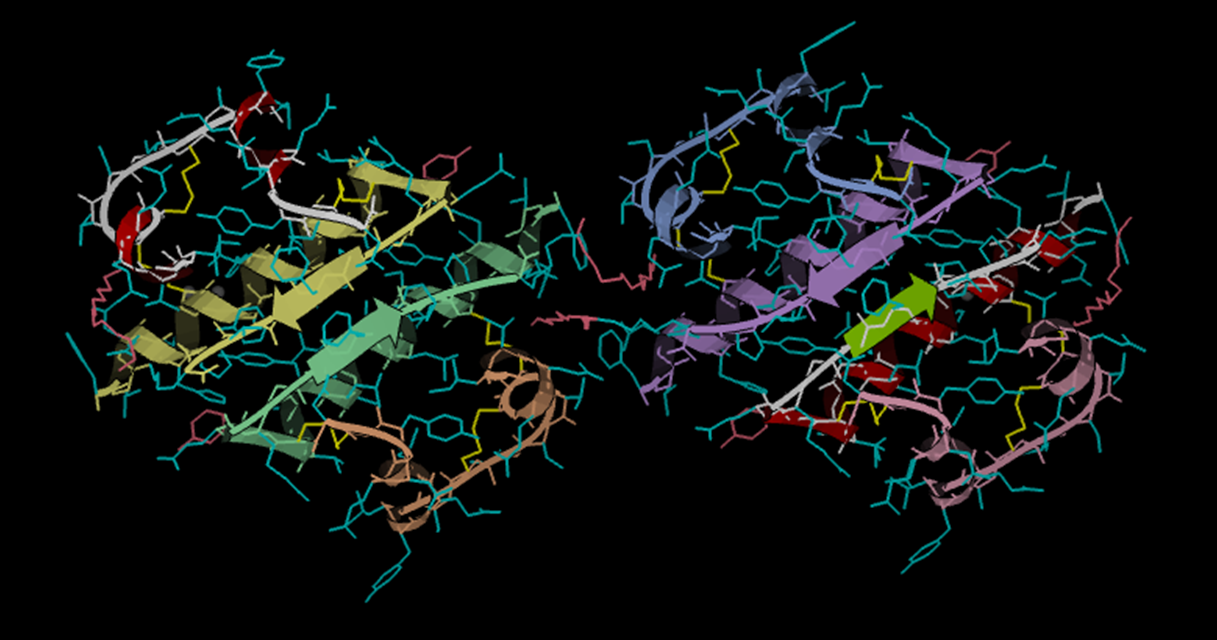
Structure of insulin detemir

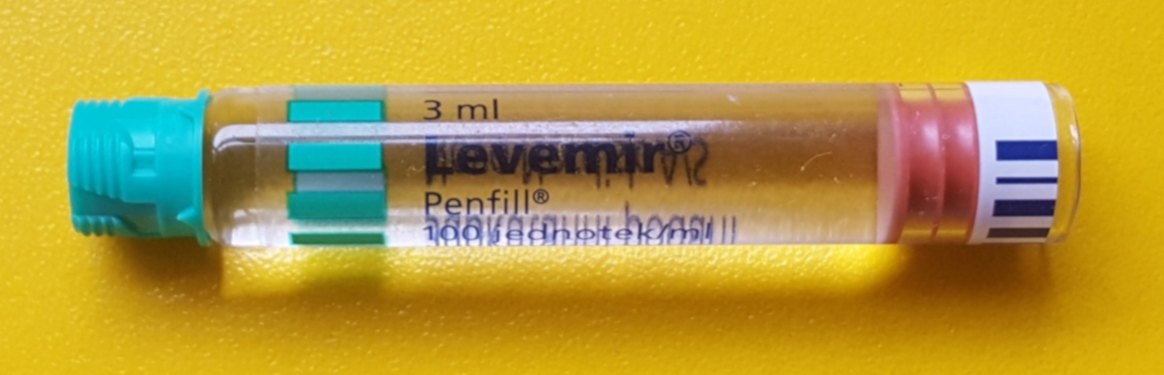
Levemir PenFill cartridge

Insulin detemir is a long-acting modified form of medical insulin used to treat both type 1 and type 2 diabetes. It is administered through subcutaneous injection. Its effects last for up to 24 hours.

Common side effects include (hypoglycemia, allergic reactions, pain at the injection site, and weight gain. It appears to be safe for use during pregnancy and breastfeeding. Insulin detemir works by increasing the amount of glucose absorbed by tissues and reducing the amount of glucose produced by the liver.

Insulin detemir was approved for medical use in the European Union in June 2004 and in the United States in June 2005. It is listed on the World Health Organization's List of Essential Medicines. In 2022, it was the 127th most commonly prescribed medication in the United States, with over 4 million prescriptions.

Insulin detemir is only sold under the name Levemir by Novo Nordisk, who owned its patent until 2019. in certain countries, Levemir and certain related products were discontinued in 2024.

=== Insulin glargine ===
Insulin glargine is a long-acting modified form of medical insulin used in the management of type 1 and type 2 diabetes. It is administered through subcutaneous injection. Its effects typically begin within an hour of injection.

Common side effects include (hypoglycemia, issues at the injection site, itchiness, and weight gain. NPH insulin is generally preferred over insulin glargine during pregnancy. After injection, microcrystals gradually release insulin over a period of approximately 24 hours. This insulin works by facilitating the absorption of glucose by body tissues and reducing glucose production by the liver.

Insulin glargine was patented, although the patent expired in most countries in 2014. It was approved for medical use in the United States in 2000. It is listed on the World Health Organization's List of Essential Medicines. In 2022, it ranked as the 28th most commonly prescribed medication in the United States, with more than 18 million prescriptions. In July 2021, the US Food and Drug Administration (FDA) approved an interchangeable biosimilar insulin product, Semglee (insulin glargine-yfgn), for the treatment of diabetes. Unbranded versions of insulin glargine and insulin glargine-yfgn are sold by Sanofi and Viatris.

Insulin Glargine brands
Brand Name	Manufacturer	Preparation method(s)	Image	References
Basaglar/Abasaglar/Abasria	Lilly	Pen	An injector pen labelled Basaglar on a wooden table	
Lantus	Sanofi	Vial, cartridge, pen		
Toujeo	Sanofi	Pen	an uncapped Toujeo injector pen sitting in front of its box and cap	
Semglee	Viatris	Vial, pen		
Rezvoglar	Lilly	Pen		
Basalog	Biocon	Vial, pen		
Optisulin	Sanofi	Vial, pen		

=== Ultralente insulin ===
Ultralente insulin was a long-acting form of medical insulin, but not a true analogue. It had an onset of 4 to 6 hours, a peak effect between 14 and 24 hours, and a duration of 28 to 36 hours. In the mid-2000s, ultralente insulin, along with lente insulin, was discontinued in the United States due to decreasing use in favor of NPH insulin and newer insulin products. By 2011, the U.S. Food and Drug Administration (FDA) had officially withdrawn approval for ultralente insulin products.

Ultralente insulin brands
Brand Name	Manufacturer	Preparation method(s)	References
Ultratard HM†	Novo Nordisk	Vial	
Humulin U†	Lilly	Vial	

== Ultralong-acting ==
=== Insulin degludec ===
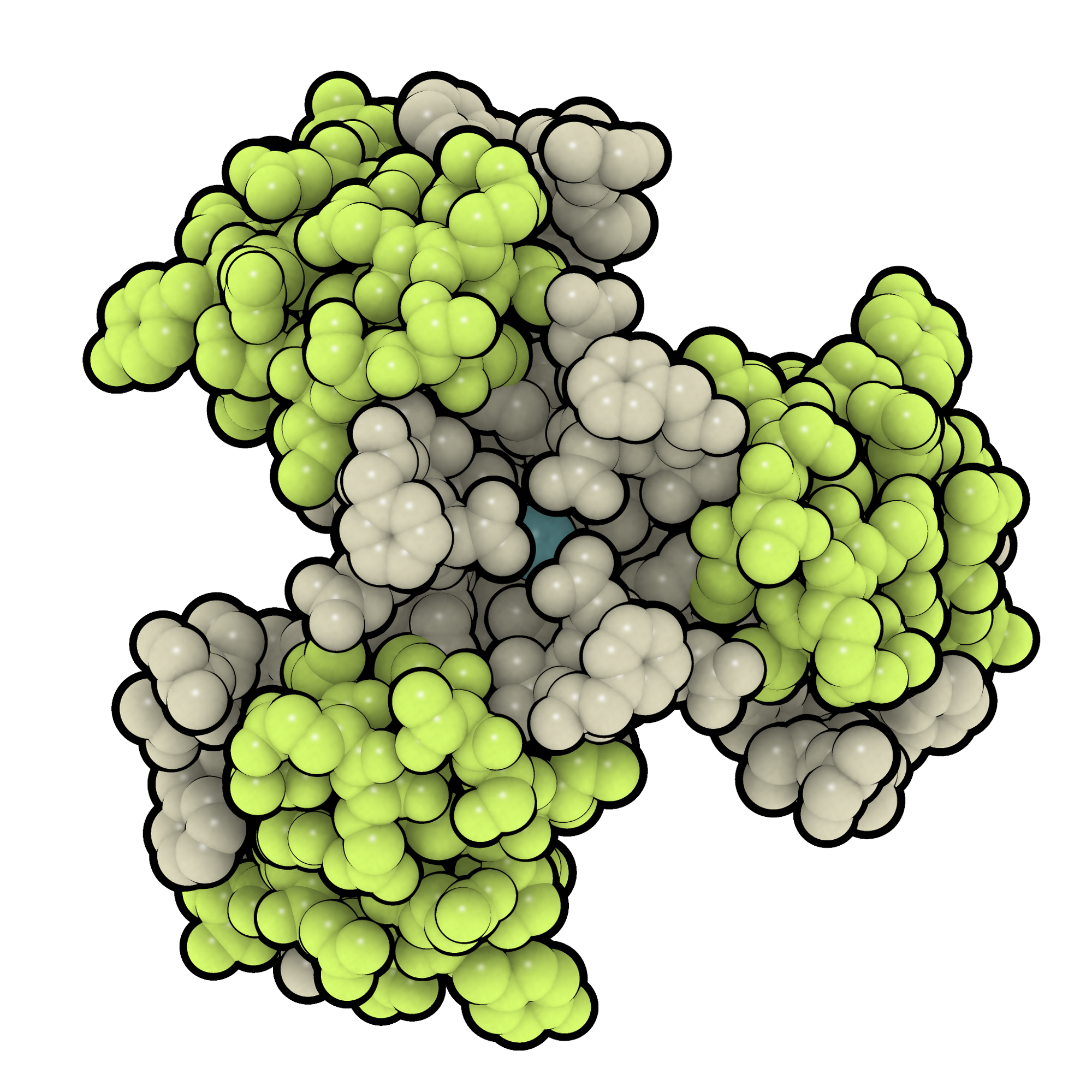
An insulin degludec hexamer. A chains are chartreuse, B chains are tan, and the central zinc atom is teal.

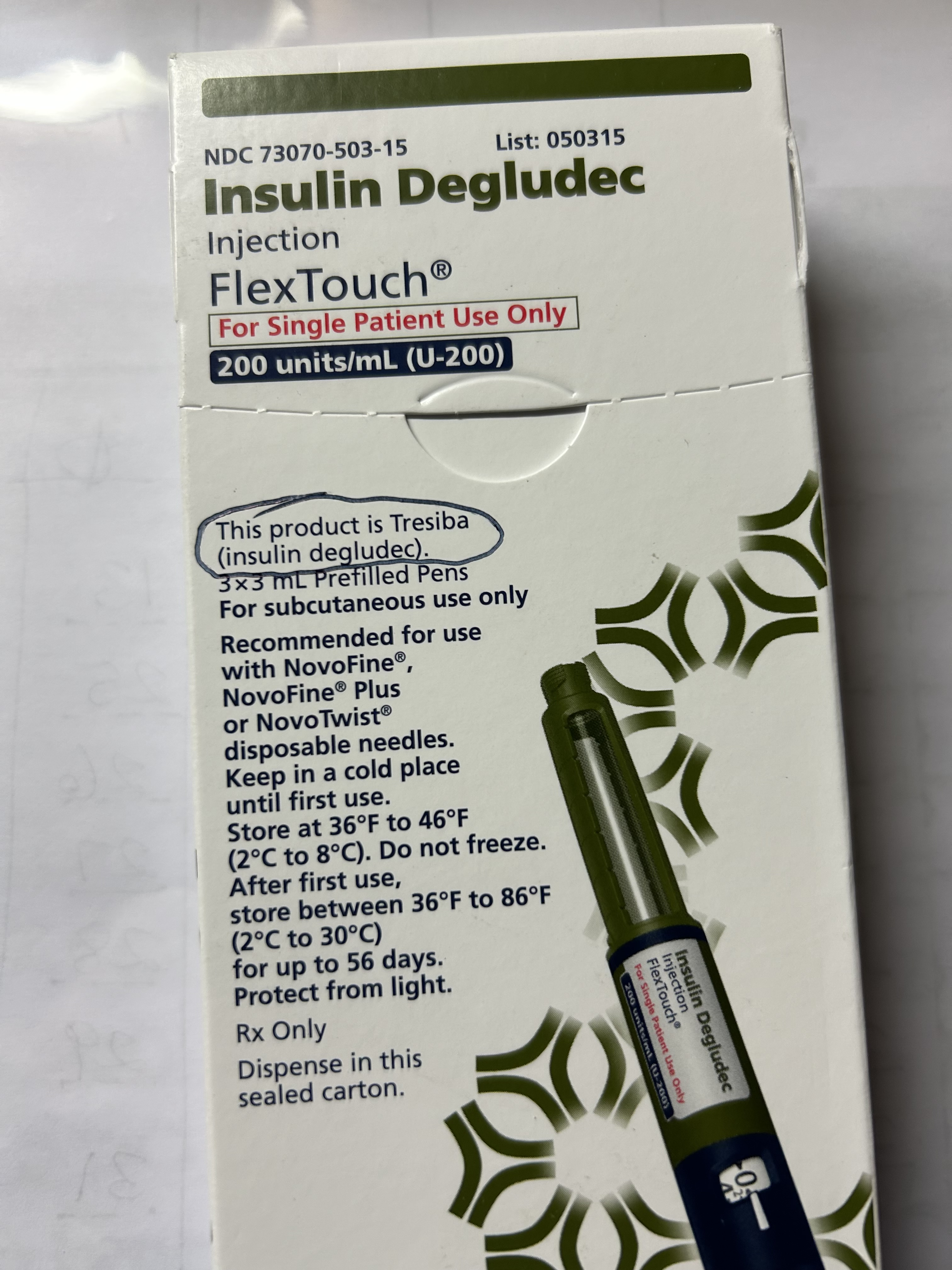
Generic insulin degludec box

Insulin degludec is an ultralong-acting basal insulin analogue developed by Novo Nordisk. Ultralong-acting insulins are a kind of insulin that can work up to a week. It is administered through subcutaneous injection to assist in controlling blood sugar levels in individuals with diabetes. Its duration of action lasts up to 42 hours, which is significantly longer than other long-acting insulins, such as insulin glargine and insulin detemir, which typically last 18 to 26 hours. This makes insulin degludec a once-daily basal insulin, providing a steady insulin level, in contrast to fast-acting bolus insulins. Insulin degludec is a modified form of insulin in which a single amino acid is deleted compared to human insulin. It is also conjugated to hexadecanedioic acid via a gamma-L-glutamyl spacer at the amino acid lysine at position B29.

It is included on the World Health Organization's List of Essential Medicines as an alternative to insulin glargine. In 2022, it was the 138th most commonly prescribed medication in the United States, with more than 4 million prescriptions. Insulin Degludec is currently only produced by Novo Nordisk under the name Tresiba. It is also available under a generic label until the start of 2026.

=== Insulin icodec ===
Insulin icodec is a medication used to enhance glycemic control in individuals with diabetes. It is an ultralong-acting basal insulin analogue developed by Novo Nordisk. The analog has a plasma half-life exceeding eight days, which is significantly longer than the 25-hour half-life of insulin degludec, the previously longest-acting insulin analogue. Insulin icodec functions as a once-weekly basal insulin.

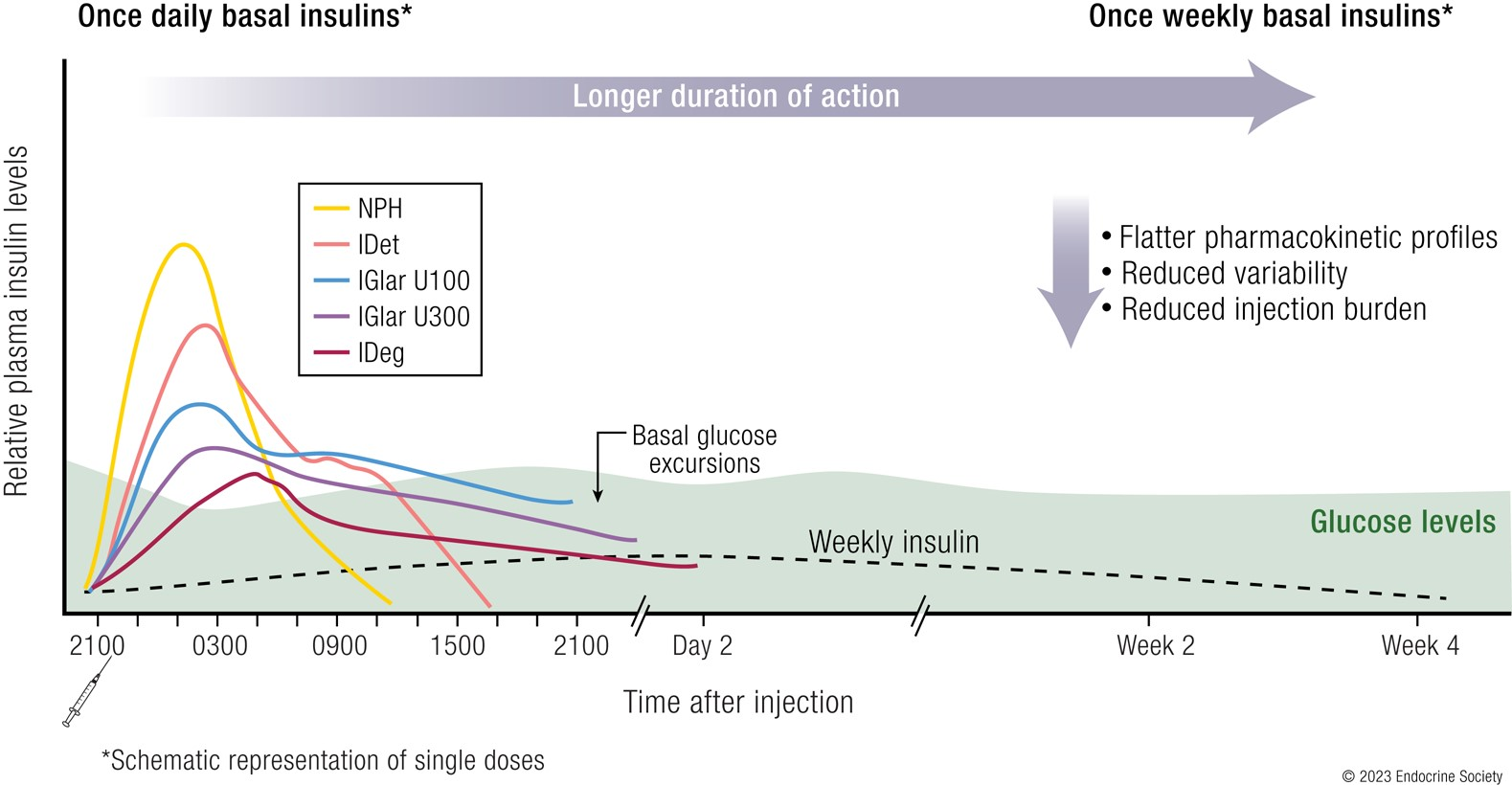
Pharmacokinetic comparison between daily insulins and once weekly icodec insulin

Structurally, insulin icodec consists of two peptide chains connected by a disulfide bridge, similar to insulin. However, it includes a C20 fatty diacid-containing side chain to enable strong, reversible albumin binding. Additionally, three amino acid substitutions enhance molecular stability, reduce insulin receptor binding, and slow clearance, collectively extending its duration of action.

Insulin icodec received approval for medical use in Canada in March 2024. In the same month, the Committee for Medicinal Products for Human Use (CHMP) of the European Medicines Agency (EMA) issued a positive opinion, recommending marketing authorization for insulin icodec. Subsequently, insulin icodec was approved for medical use in the European Union in May 2024. Insulin icodec is currently marketed by Novo Nordisk under the name Awiqli (pronounced A-week-ly).

== Insulin mixtures ==
=== General mixtures ===
Insulin mixtures can sometimes be combined in a single syringe, such as when mixing intermediate-acting insulin with rapid- or short-acting insulin. However, not all types of insulin are compatible for mixing.

For convenience, there are premixed formulations of rapid- and intermediate-acting insulins. These come in fixed ratios like 75/25, 70/30, or 50/50. For example, a 75/25 mix contains 75% intermediate-acting insulin and 25% rapid-acting insulin. These are typically injected twice a day at the start of meals. The mixture appears cloudy, and it begins to work as quickly as the rapid-acting insulin, but it lasts as long as the intermediate-acting insulin.

Branded general mixtures
Brand Name	Insulin Concentrations	Manufacturer	Preparation method(s)	Image	References
Humalog Mix 75/25	Protamine/lispro (75%/25%)	Lilly	Vial, pen		
Humalog Mix 50/50	Protamine/lispro (50%/50%)	Lilly	Vial, pen		
Lupisulin M 30/70	Regular human/NPH (30%/70%)	Lupin	Vial, pen		
Insugen 50/50	Regular human/NPH (50%/50%)	Biocon	Vial, cartridge		
Insugen 30/70	Regular human/NPH (30%/70%)	Biocon	Vial, cartridge		
Mixtard 30†	Regular human/NPH (30%/70%)	Novo Nordisk	Vial, cartridge, pen	clear glass tube labelled Mixtard 30 containing a cloudy white liquid	
NovoMix 30	Protamine/aspart (70%/30%)	Novo Nordisk	Vial, cartridge, pen	clear glass tube labelled Novomix 30 containing a cloudy white liquid	
Ryzodeg	Degludec/aspart (70%/30%)	Novo Nordisk	Cartridge, pen		
Dipisulin 30/70	Regular human/NPH (30%/70%)	Darou Pakhsh	Vial		
Univia Mix 30/70	Regular human/NPH (30%/70%)	Pfizer	Vial		
Jusline 30/70	Regular human/NPH (30%/70%)	Julphar	Vial		
Gensulin M30	Regular human/NPH (30%/70%)	Bioton	Cartridge		
SciLin M30	Regular human/NPH (30%/70%)	SciGen	Vial, cartridge		

=== Insulin glargine/lixisenatide ===
Insulin glargine/lixisenatide, marketed under the brand name Soliqua, is a fixed-dose combination medication that combines insulin glargine and lixisenatide for the treatment of diabetes. The most common side effects include hypoglycemia, diarrhea, vomiting, and nausea.

Insulin glargine/lixisenatide was approved for medical use in the United States in November 2016, and in the European Union in January 2017. It is currently only marketed by Sanofi as Soliqua.

=== Insulin degludec/liraglutide ===
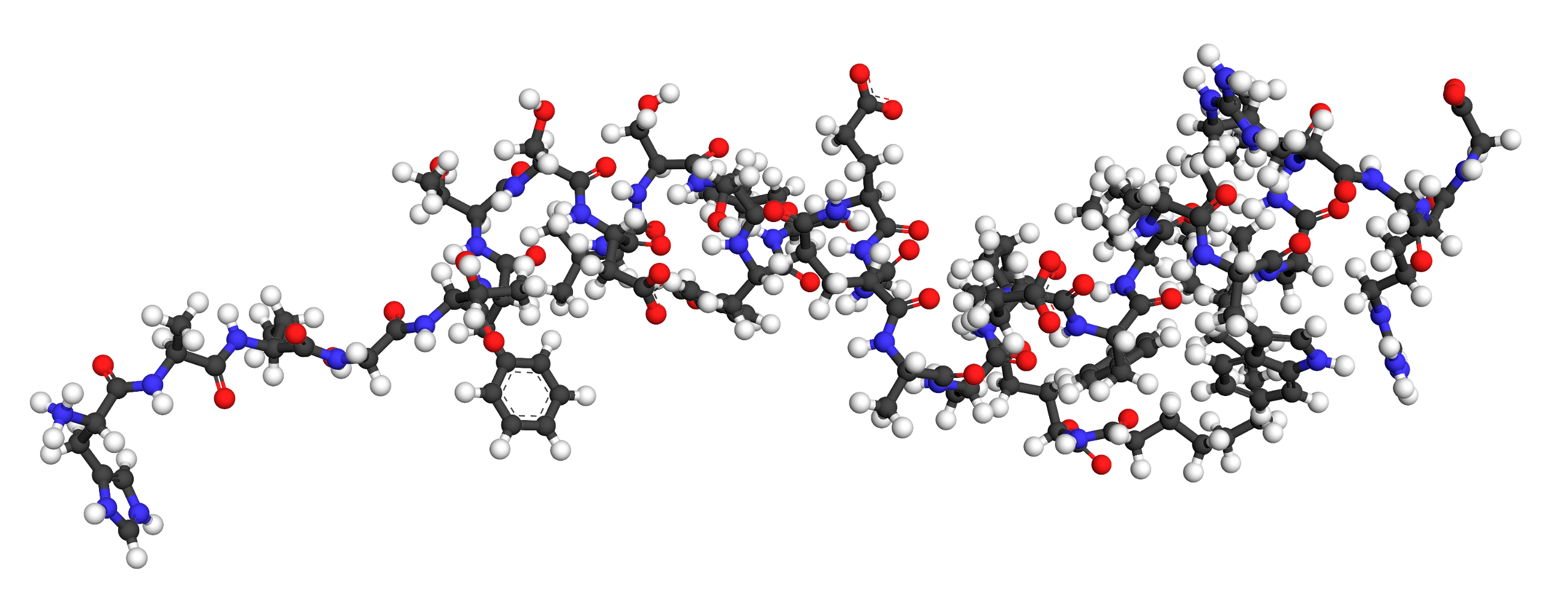
Ball-and-stick model of liraglutide

Insulin degludec/liraglutide is a fixed-dose combination medication used to improve glycemic control in adults with type 2 diabetes, alongside diet and exercise. It consists of insulin degludec and liraglutide and is administered through subcutaneous injection. Gastrointestinal side effects include nausea, diarrhea, vomiting, constipation, dyspepsia (indigestion), gastritis (stomach inflammation), abdominal pain, flatulence, gastroesophageal reflux disease (acid reflux), and abdominal distension. Severe symptomatic hypoglycemia was reported in a small number of patients during clinical trials.

Insulin degludec functions as a replacement insulin, facilitating glucose uptake into cells and thereby reducing the symptoms and complications of diabetes. It differs slightly from human insulin, as it is absorbed more gradually and consistently, allowing for prolonged action. Liraglutide, a GLP-1 receptor agonist, mimics the effects of incretin hormones by enhancing insulin secretion from the pancreas in response to food intake, thereby aiding blood glucose regulation.

Insulin degludec/liraglutide is sold by Novo Nordisk under the name Xultophy.

== Veterinary insulins ==
=== General insulins ===
Insulins that are used mostly in humans are sometimes also used in animals such as cats and dogs. These include Lantus (insulin glargine), Novolin (NPH insulin), Humulin (NPH insulin), and Levemir (Detemir). It is of note that one of the listed insulins other than lente and PZI are FDA-approved for use in animals.

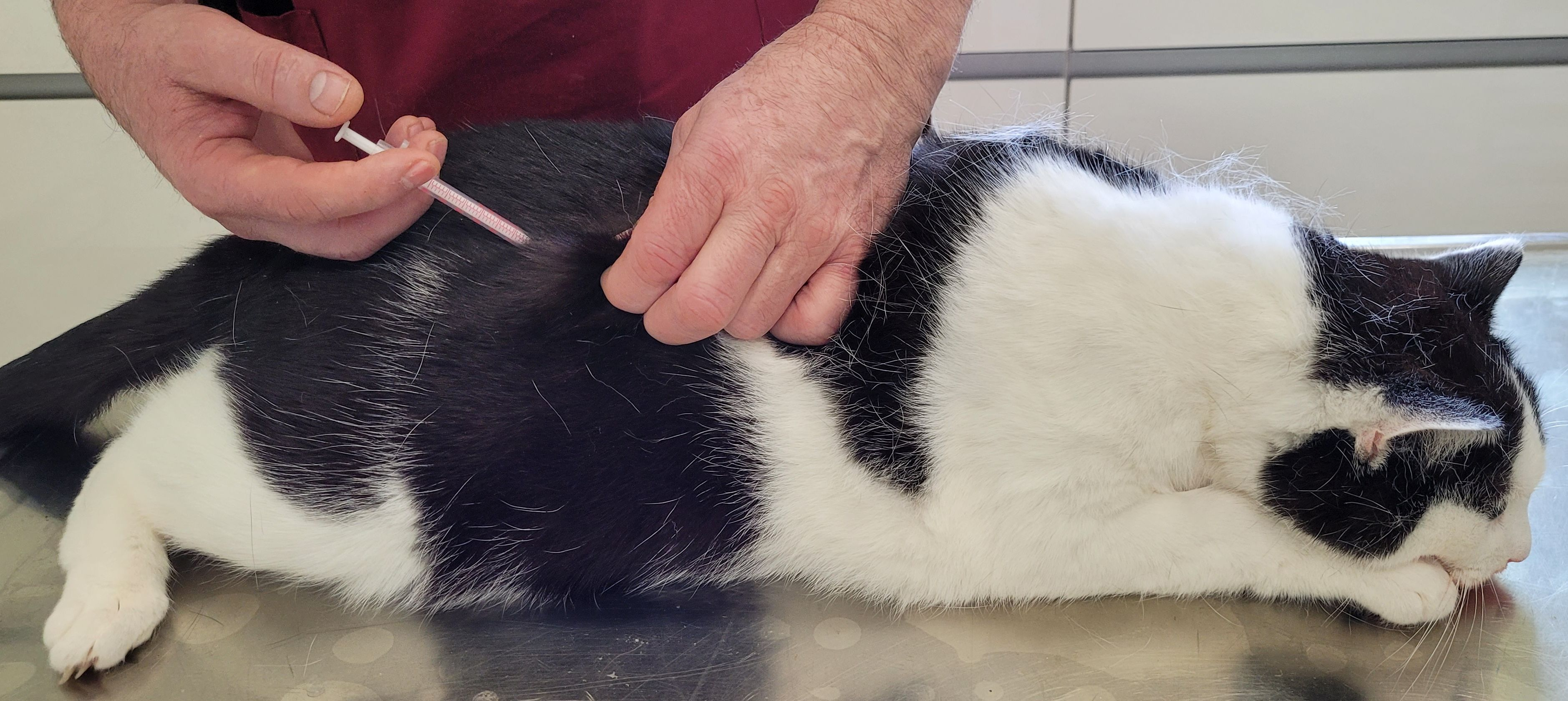
A cat receiving an insulin injection

=== Lente insulin ===
Following the discontinuation of Lente insulin for human use, the FDA approved a veterinary formulation derived from porcine insulin, known as Vetsulin, for daily administration in dogs and twice-daily use in cats. Insulin analogs developed for human use after Lente insulin's discontinuation have not yet been demonstrated to offer the same benefits and predictability in feline and canine patients. For this reason, along with other considerations, Lente insulin remains a widely used treatment for diabetes in both dogs and cats.

Lente insulin is currently produced by Merck Animal Health under the name Vetsulin.

=== PZI insulin (NPH) ===
Protamine zinc insulin (PZI) is the name of a slight variation of NPH insulin that includes zinc, which is similar to lente. It is used for cats and dogs. It is manufactured by Boehringer Ingelheim Animal Health under the name ProZinc.
