= Selenoinsulin =

Experimental insulin analogue

Selenoinsulin (abbreviated to Se-Ins) is an experimental insulin analogue first described in 2017. It is a modified form of bovine pancreatic insulin in which the interchain disulfide bond between residues A7 and B7 is replaced with a diselenide bond formed by two selenocysteine residues. In laboratory studies, selenoinsulin retained biological activity comparable to that of bovine pancreatic insulin and showed greater resistance to degradation by the insulin-degrading enzyme (IDE).
