= ORMD-0801 =

Experimental drug

ORMD-0801 is an experimental insulin analog that is taken by mouth, rather than injected. It is developed by Oramed Pharmaceuticals to treat diabetes.
