= Omidubicel =

Allogenic cord blood cell therapy

Clinical data
- Trade names: Omisirge
- Other names: omidubicel-onlv
- License data: US DailyMed: Omidubicel
- Routes of administration: Intravenous
- ATC code: None

Legal status
- Legal status: US: ℞-only

Identifiers
- DrugBank: DB17132
- UNII: ET4JC4S66E
- KEGG: D12592

Omidubicel, sold under the brand name Omisirge, is a blood-based cell therapy used for the treatment of blood cancers, and severe aplastic anemia. Omidubicel is a nicotinamide-modified allogeneic hematopoietic progenitor cell therapy derived from cord blood.

The most common adverse reactions include infections, graft-versus-host disease, and infusion reactions.

Omidubicel is composed of human allogeneic stem cells from umbilical cord blood that are processed and cultured with nicotinamide (a form of vitamin B3). Each dose is patient-specific, containing healthy stem cells from an allogeneic pre-screened donor, meaning it comes from a different individual rather than using the patient's own cells. Omidubicel was approved for medical use in the United States in April 2023.

== Medical uses ==
Omidubicel is indicated for use in people twelve years of age and older with blood cancers (hematologic malignancies) planned for umbilical cord blood transplantation following myeloablative conditioning to reduce the time to neutrophil recovery and the incidence of infection; and for use in people six years of age and older with severe aplastic anemia following reduced intensity conditioning.

== History ==
The US Food and Drug Administration (FDA) evaluated the safety and effectiveness of omidubicel based on a randomized, multicenter study comparing transplantation of omidubicel to transplantation of umbilical cord blood, in subjects between the ages of 12 and 65 years. The study enrolled a total of 125 participants. All participants in the study had confirmed blood cancers. The efficacy of omidubicel was based on the amount of time needed for recovery of the participant's neutrophils (a type of white blood cell that helps protect the body from infections) and the incidence of infections following transplantation. In total, 125 participants were randomized--62 participants to receive omidubicel-onlv and 63 to the unmanipulated cord blood group. Fifty-two participants were transplanted with omidubicel-onlv receiving a median CD34+ cell dose of 9.0 X 106 cells/kg (range 2.1 – 47.6 X 106 cells/kg). Fifty-six participants were transplanted in the unmanipulated cord blood arm with one or two cord units (66% received two cord units). In the 42 participants with reported post-thaw cell dose, the median CD34+ cell dose was 0.2 X 106 cells/kg (range 0.0 – 0.8 X 106 cells/kg). Multiple conditioning regimens were used, including total body irradiation-based or chemotherapy-based options.

The FDA granted the application for omidubicel priority review, breakthrough therapy, and orphan drug designations. The FDA granted regular approval of Omisirge to Gamida Cell Ltd.
