= Odulimomab =

Pharmaceutical drug

Monoclonal antibody
- Type: Whole antibody
- Source: Mouse
- Target: CD11a

Clinical data
- ATC code: none

Identifiers
- CAS Number: 159445-64-4
- ChemSpider: none
- UNII: 39R9XU694M

Odulimomab is an investigational drug for the prevention of transplant rejection and for the treatment of various immunological diseases.

It is a mouse monoclonal antibody directed against the alpha chain of the protein lymphocyte function-associated antigen 1 which is involved in immune reactions.
