= Oregovomab =

Monoclonal antibody

Monoclonal antibody
- Type: Whole antibody
- Source: Mouse
- Target: CA125

Clinical data
- Trade names: OvaRex
- ATC code: none

Identifiers
- CAS Number: 213327-37-8
- ChemSpider: none
- UNII: HX101E7L6S
- KEGG: D05269

Chemical and physical data
- Molar mass: ca. 150 kg/mol

Oregovomab (marketed under the trade name OvaRex) is a mouse monoclonal antibody it binds to the antigen CA125, a carbohydrate antigen. It is designed for the treatment of ovarian cancer.

This drug was developed by AltaRex Corp.
