= NNC2215 =

Type of insulin

NNC2215 is a bioengineered glucose-sensitive insulin. The drug is designed by a team of Novo Nordisk researchers.

NNC2215 can sense the glucose concentration presence in blood, through incorporation of a glucose binding molecule developed in the University of Bristol. The protein's sensitivity is reduced when low concentration of glucose, thus reducing the risk of hypoglycemia. In addition, it can effectively cover the risk of fluctuations of blood sugar levels.

The study was published on scientific journal Nature on October 16, 2024. This study demonstrated the ability of protein engineering in future medicine and a major advancement in treatment capabilities.

== Background ==
A glucose sensitive treatment method for diabetes has long been pursued by researchers since 1979. Such a platform is expected to solve the problem of fluctuations of blood sugar levels. For diabetic patients, skipping a single meal can lead to hypoglycemia, a common complication which can lead to loss of consciousness or seizures.

There have been several attempts to create such a medicine, with various levels of success.

== See also ==
- Diabetes
- Hyperglycemia
- Hypoglycemia
