= Insulin tregopil =

Clinical data
- Other names: IN-105

Legal status
- Legal status: Investigational

Identifiers
- CAS Number: 874442-57-6
- UNII: 3UYC0OZ5ON

Insulin tregopil is a fast-acting insulin analog which, unlike other forms of insulin, is delivered by mouth. It is developed by Biocon for diabetes.
