= Mirikizumab =

Medication

Monoclonal antibody
- Type: Whole antibody
- Source: Humanized (from mouse)
- Target: Interleukin 23

Clinical data
- Trade names: Omvoh
- Other names: LY3074828, Mirikizumab-mrkz
- License data: US DailyMed: Mirikizumab
- Pregnancy category: AU: B1
- Routes of administration: Intravenous infusion
- ATC code: L04AC24 (WHO)

Legal status
- Legal status: AU: S4 (Prescription only); CA: ℞-only; US: ℞-only; EU: Rx-only; JP: Rx-only

Identifiers
- CAS Number: 1884201-71-1
- DrugBank: DB14910
- ChemSpider: none
- UNII: Z7HVY03PHP
- KEGG: D11123

Chemical and physical data
- Formula: C_{6380}H_{9842}N_{1686}O_{2004}S_{48}
- Molar mass: 143767.59 g·mol^{−1}

Mirikizumab, sold under the brand name Omvoh, is a monoclonal antibody used for the treatment of ulcerative colitis. It is designed to attach to interleukin-23 (IL-23) and block its activity.

The most common side effects include upper respiratory tract infections (nose and throat infections), headache, rash and reactions at the site of injection (when given by injection under the skin).

Mirikizumab was approved for medical use in the European Union in May 2023, and in the United States in October 2023.

== Medical uses ==
In the European Union, mirikizumab is indicated for the treatment of adults with moderately to severely active ulcerative colitis who have had an inadequate response with, lost response to, or were intolerant to either conventional therapy or a biologic treatment.

In the United States, mirikizumab is indicated for the treatment of adults with moderately to severely active ulcerative colitis. In January 2025, the US Food and Drug Administration (FDA) expanded the indication for mirikizumab to include the treatment of moderately to severely active Crohn's disease in adults.

== History ==
Mirikizumab was developed by Eli Lilly and Company.

The approval was based on the LUCENT 1 clinical study which evaluated the safety and efficacy of mirikizumab in participants with moderately to severely active ulcerative colitis (UC) who have had an inadequate response to, loss of response, or intolerant to conventional or biologic therapy for UC.

All participants enrolled in the program had a diagnosis of UC for at least three months prior to baseline and a confirmed diagnosis of moderately or severely active UC, as assessed by the modified Mayo score (MMS).

After twelve weeks of induction treatment, 24% of participants on mirikizumab achieved clinical remission, which compared with 15% for those on a placebo. During the maintenance phase, 66% of mirikizumab takers who had achieved remission at twelve weeks stayed in remission through one year of treatment. Among those who achieved clinical response at twelve weeks, 51% of all mirikizumab-treated participants remained in clinical remission at one year, compared to 27% of those on placebo. Additionally, 99% who achieved clinical remission at one year were steroid-free, and 39% had achieved resolution or near resolution of bowel urgency, which is reported by UC participants as one of the most disruptive symptoms of the condition.

== Society and culture ==
=== Legal status ===
In 2023, mirikizumab was approved as a first-in-class treatment for adults with moderately to severely active ulcerative colitis in Japan; however, approval in the United States has not been granted due to manufacturing issues.

In March 2023, the Committee for Medicinal Products for Human Use (CHMP) of the European Medicines Agency adopted a positive opinion, recommending the granting of a marketing authorization for the medicinal product Omvoh, intended for the treatment of ulcerative colitis. The applicant for this medicinal product is Eli Lilly Nederland B.V. Mirikizumab was approved for medical use in the European Union in May 2023. Mirikizumab was approved for medical use in the United States in October 2023.

=== Names ===
Mirikizumab is the international nonproprietary name.
