= Oramed =

Pharmaceutical company of Israel

Oramed Pharmaceuticals Inc.
- Company type: Public
- Traded as: Nasdaq: ORMP; Russell Microcap Index component TASE: ORMP
- ISIN: US68403P2039
- Industry: Biotech
- Founded: 2006; 20 years ago
- Headquarters: Jerusalem
- Key people: Nadav Kidron (CEO)
- Website: oramed.com

Oramed Pharmaceuticals Inc. (Hebrew: אורמד), is a publicly traded company engaged in the development of oral drug delivery systems – most notably an oral insulin capsule for treating type 2 diabetes. The company was founded in 2006 and is headquartered in Jerusalem. Its shares are listed on the NASDAQ Capital Market and the Tel Aviv Stock Exchange.

== History ==
Oramed Pharmaceuticals was founded in 2006 by Miriam Kidron, a scientist at the Hadassah University Hospital in Jerusalem, and her son Nadav Kidron.

== Product pipeline ==
Oramed considers its flagship product to be an oral insulin capsule developed to treat sufferers of type 2 diabetes. The Company is currently conducting Phase 3 trials, under the FDA, for oral insulin in Type 2 diabetes.

In addition to the oral insulin capsule, Oramed is developing an exenatide-based capsule designed to balance blood sugar levels and control appetite, and is conducting clinical trials for the treatment of NASH with oral insulin.

In 2021, Oramed created a subsidiary, Oravax Medical, to bring an oral Covid-19 vaccine to market.

In January 2023, a Phase 3 trial of Oramed's orally administered insulin for Type 2 diabetes patients failed, thus causing the share price to plunge. The company has mentioned that the pill worked for a subset of the population and will pursue a Phase 3 trial for that subset.

In May 2023, Ben Shapiro invested $4.7 million and was named to the board of directors.

On May 15, 2023, it was reported that Oramed's insulin pill was approved in China and will work with a Chinese firm to apply for marketing authorizations.

== Subsidiaries ==
OraTech Pharmaceuticals is a joint venture formed by Oramed Pharmaceuticals and Hefei Tianhui Biotech, to commercialize its insulin capsule and is expected to list on the NASDAQ sometime in 2025.

== See also ==
- Avram Hershko
- List of companies of Israel
- List of Israeli companies quoted on the Nasdaq
