= Insulin efsitora alfa =

Medication

Clinical data
- Trade names: Onswik, Onswik Kwikpen
- Other names: LY3209590; LY-3209590, insulin efsitora alfa-gobe
- License data: US DailyMed: Insulin efsitora alfa
- Routes of administration: Subcutaneous
- Drug class: Antidiabetic agent
- ATC code: None

Legal status
- Legal status: US: ℞-only; EU: Rx-only; JP: Rx-only, MX: Rx-only

Identifiers
- CAS Number: 2131038-11-2
- UNII: OZ465SMQ28
- KEGG: D13028

Chemical and physical data
- Formula: C_{2810}H_{4296}N_{776}O_{882}S_{32}
- Molar mass: 64087.75 g·mol^{−1}

Insulin efsitora alfa, sold under the brand name Onswik, is an antidiabetic medication used for the treatment of type 2 diabetes. It is a long-acting insulin analog developed by Eli Lilly.

Insulin efsitora alfa was authorized for medical use in the European Union in August 2026, and approved for medical use in the United States in September 2026.

== Medical uses ==
In the European Union, insulin efsitora alfa is indicated for the treatment of type 2 diabetes in adults.

In the United States, insulin efsitora alfa indicated as an adjunct to diet and exercise to improve glycemic control in adults with type 2 diabetes.

== History ==
The glycemic control and safety of insulin efsitora alfa were found similar to insulin degludec in a phase II trial.

== Society and culture ==
=== Legal status ===
In June 2026, the Committee for Medicinal Products for Human Use of the European Medicines Agency adopted a positive opinion, recommending the granting of a marketing authorization for the medicinal product Onswik, intended for the treatment of type 2 diabetes. The applicant for this medicinal product is Eli Lilly Nederland. Insulin efsitora alfa was authorized for medical use in the European Union in August 2026.

Insulin efsitora alfa was approved for medical use in the United States in September 2026.

=== Names ===
Insulin efsitora alfa is the international nonproprietary name.

Insulin efsitora alfa is sold under the brand names Onswik and Onswik KwikPen.
