= Odronextamab =

Monoclonal antibody

Monoclonal antibody
- Type: Bi-specific T-cell engager
- Source: Humanized
- Target: CD20, CD3

Clinical data
- Trade names: Ordspono
- Other names: REGN1979; REGN-1979
- Drug class: Antineoplastic
- ATC code: L01FX34 (WHO)

Legal status
- Legal status: EU: Rx-only

Identifiers
- CAS Number: 1801338-64-6
- DrugBank: DB16684
- UNII: 8R5CM46UIO
- KEGG: D11534

Chemical and physical data
- Formula: C_{6458}H_{9950}N_{1728}O_{2020}S_{46}
- Molar mass: 145593.47 g·mol^{−1}

Odronextamab, sold under the brand name Ordspono, is a CD20 x CD3 bispecific monoclonal antibody that is used for the treatment of follicular lymphoma or diffuse large B-cell lymphoma. It was developed by Regeneron Pharmaceuticals.

The most common side effects include cytokine release syndrome, infections, neutropenia, pyrexia (fever), anemia, thrombocytopenia, and diarrhea.

Odronextamab was approved for medical use in the European Union in August 2024.

== Medical uses ==
Odronextamab is indicated for the treatment of adults with relapsed or refractory follicular lymphoma after two or more lines of systemic therapy; and for the treatment of adults with relapsed or refractory diffuse large B‑cell lymphoma after two or more lines of systemic therapy.

== Side Effects ==
The most common side effects include cytokine release syndrome, infections, neutropenia, pyrexia, anemia, thrombocytopenia, and diarrhea.

== Society and culture ==
=== Legal status ===
In June 2024, the Committee for Medicinal Products for Human Use of the European Medicines Agency adopted a positive opinion, recommending the granting of a conditional marketing authorization for the medicinal product Ordspono, intended for the treatment of follicular lymphoma and diffuse large B-cell lymphoma. The applicant for this medicinal product is Regeneron Ireland Designated Activity Company. Odronextamab was approved for medical use in the European Union in August 2024.

=== Names ===
Odronextamab is the international nonproprietary name.
