= List of drugs: Cj–Cl =

This multi-page article lists pharmaceutical drugs alphabetically by name. Many drugs have more than one name and, therefore, the same drug may be listed more than once. Brand names and generic names are differentiated by capitalizing brand names.

See also the list of the top 100 bestselling branded drugs, ranked by sales.

Abbreviations are used in the list as follows:

- INN = International nonproprietary name
- BAN = British Approved Name
- USAN = United States Adopted Name
- Two-letter codes for countries

Lists of drugs
1–9 | A | B | C | D | E | F | G | H | I | J | K | L | M | N | O | P | Q | R | S | T | U | V | W | X | Y | Z

Ca | Cb–Ce | Cf–Ch | Ci | Cj–Cl | Cm–Co | Cp–Cz

== cl ==
- Cl-719

=== cla ===
- cladribine (INN)
- Claforan (Sanofi-Aventis), also known as cefotaxime
- clamidoxic acid (INN)
- Clamohexal (Hexal Australia) [Au].
- clamoxyquine (INN)
- clanfenur (INN)
- clanobutin (INN)
- clantifen (INN)
- Claravis (Barr Pharmaceuticals)
- Clarinex
- Claripel
- clarithromycin (INN)
- Claritin (Schering-Plough)
- clavulanic acid (INN)
- Clavulin (GlaxoSmithKline)
- clazolam (INN)
- clazolimine (INN)
- clazuril (INN)

=== cle ===
- Clear Away Disc
- Clear By Design Gel
- Clear Eyes ACR
- Clear Tussin 30
- Clearsil Maximum Strength
- clebopride (INN)
- clefamide (INN)
- clemastine (INN)
- clemeprol (INN)
- clemizole penicillin (INN)
- clemizole (INN)
- clenbuterol (INN)
- Clenia
- clenoliximab (INN)
- clenpirin (INN)
- clentiazem (INN)
- Cleocin
- clesrovimab (USAN, INN)
- clesrovimab-cfor
- cletoquine (INN)
- Clevecord
- clevidipine (INN, USAN)
- Cleviprex (The Medicines Company) redirects to clevidipine
- clevudine (INN)

=== cli ===
==== clib-clin ====
- clibucaine (INN)
- clidafidine (INN)
- clidanac (INN)
- clidinium bromide (INN)
- Climacteron
- Climara pro
- Climara
- climazolam (INN)
- climbazole (INN)
- climiqualine (INN)
- clinafloxacin (INN)
- Clinda-derm
- Clindagel
- Clindamax
- clindamycin (INN)
- Clindets
- Clindex
- Clindoxyl Gel
- Clinimix E
- Clinimix
- Clinisol
- clinofibrate (INN)
- clinolamide (INN)
- Clinoril
- clinprost (INN)

==== clio-clis ====
- clioquinol (INN)
- clioxanide (INN)
- cliprofen (INN)
- cliropamine (INN)
- Clistin

=== clo ===
==== clob-cloc ====
- clobazam (INN)
- clobenoside (INN)
- clobenzepam (INN)
- clobenzorex (INN)
- clobenztropine (INN)
- clobetasol (INN)
- clobetasone (INN)
- Clobex
- clobutinol (INN)
- clobuzarit (INN)
- clocanfamide (INN)
- clocapramine (INN)
- clociguanil (INN)
- clocinizine (INN)
- Clocort Maximum Strength
- clocortolone (INN)
- clocoumarol (INN)

==== clod ====
- clodacaine (INN)
- clodanolene (INN)
- clodantoin (INN)
- clodazon (INN)
- Cloderm
- clodoxopone (INN)
- clodronate disodium (USAN)
- clodronic acid (INN)

==== clof-clog ====
- clofarabine (USAN)
- clofazimine (INN)
- clofedanol (INN)
- clofenamic acid (INN)
- clofenamide (INN)
- clofenciclan (INN)
- clofenetamine (INN)
- clofenotane (INN)
- clofenoxyde (INN)
- clofenvinfos (INN)
- clofeverine (INN)
- clofexamide (INN)
- clofezone (INN)
- clofibrate (INN)
- clofibric acid (INN)
- clofibride (INN)
- clofilium phosphate (INN)
- clofluperol (INN)
- clofoctol (INN)
- cloforex (INN)
- clofurac (INN)
- clogestone (INN)
- cloguanamil (INN)

==== clom-clon ====
- clomacran (INN)
- clomegestone (INN)
- clometacin (INN)
- clometerone (INN)
- clomethiazole (INN)
- clometocillin (INN)
- Clomhexal (Hexal Australia) [Au], also known as clomifene
- Clomid
- clomifene (INN)
- clomifenoxide (INN)
- clominorex (INN)
- clomipramine (INN)
- clomocycline (INN)
- clomoxir (INN)
- Clonapan
- clonazepam (INN)
- clonazoline (INN)
- clonidine (INN)
- clonitazene (INN)
- clonitrate (INN)
- clonixeril (INN)
- clonixin (INN)

==== clop-cloq ====
- clopamide (INN)
- clopenthixol (INN)
- cloperastine (INN)
- cloperidone (INN)
- clopidogrel (INN)
- clopidol (INN)
- clopimozide (INN)
- clopipazan (INN)
- clopirac (INN)
- Clopixol
- cloponone (INN)
- Clopra
- cloprednol (INN)
- cloprostenol (INN)
- cloprothiazole (INN)
- cloquinate (INN)
- cloquinozine (INN)

==== clor ====
- cloracetadol (INN)
- cloral betaine (INN)
- cloramfenicol pantotenate complex (INN)
- cloranolol (INN)
- clorazepate (INN)
- cloretate (INN)
- clorexolone (INN)
- clorgiline (INN)
- cloricromen (INN)
- cloridarol (INN)
- clorindanic acid (INN)
- clorindanol (INN)
- clorindione (INN)
- clormecaine (INN)
- clorofene (INN)
- cloroperone (INN)
- cloroqualone (INN)
- Clorotekal
- clorotepine (INN)
- Clorpactin WCS-90
- Clorpactin XCB Powder
- clorprenaline (INN)
- Clorpres
- clorsulon (INN)
- clortermine (INN)

==== clos-cloz ====
- closantel (INN)
- closiramine (INN)
- clostebol (INN)
- clotiapine (INN)
- clotiazepam (INN)
- cloticasone (INN)
- clotioxone (INN)
- clotixamide (INN)
- Clotrimaderm
- clotrimazole (INN)
- clovoxamine (INN)
- cloxacepride (INN)
- cloxacillin (INN)
- Cloxapen
- cloxazolam (INN)
- cloxestradiol (INN)
- cloximate (INN)
- cloxiquine (INN)
- cloxotestosterone (INN)
- cloxypendyl (INN)
- clozapine (INN)
- Clozaril

=== cly ===
- Clysodrast
