= C14H21ClN2O2 =

The molecular formula C_{14}H_{21}ClN_{2}O_{2} (molar mass: 284.78 g/mol, exact mass: 284.1292 u) may refer to:

- Clofexamide (or amichlophene)
- Clovoxamine
