= C19H25NO2 =

The molecular formula C_{19}H_{25}NO_{2} (molar mass: 299.41 g/mol, exact mass: 299.1885 u) may refer to:

- Buphenine
- Cliropamine
- Ethylketazocine (WIN-35,197-2)
- Proxorphan
