= SH 863 =

SH 863 may refer to:

- Clocortolone pivalate, a synthetic glucocorticoid
- State highway 863, a list of highways numbered 863
