= Timelotem =

Chemical compound

Clinical data
- ATC code: none

Identifiers
- IUPAC name: 10-fluoro-3-methyl-7-thiophen-2-yl-2,4,4a,5-tetrahydro-1H-pyrazino[1,2-a][1,4]benzodiazepine
- CAS Number: 96306-34-2
- PubChem CID: 65844
- UNII: 090DE9CRP1
- CompTox Dashboard (EPA): DTXSID90869269

Chemical and physical data
- Formula: C_{17}H_{18}FN_{3}S
- Molar mass: 315.41 g·mol^{−1}
- 3D model (JSmol): Interactive image
- SMILES: CN1CCN2C(C1)CN=C(C3=C2C=C(C=C3)F)C4=CC=CS4
- InChI: InChI=1S/C17H18FN3S/c1-20-6-7-21-13(11-20)10-19-17(16-3-2-8-22-16)14-5-4-12(18)9-15(14)21/h2-5,8-9,13H,6-7,10-11H2,1H3; Key:ICHHTOMWWAMJQP-UHFFFAOYSA-N

Timelotem is a benzodiazepine derivative with an unusual activity profile. Unlike most benzodiazepines, timelotem has little or no activity at the GABA_{A} receptor, but instead acts as an atypical antipsychotic drug with similar pharmacology and effects to the structurally related drug clozapine. It has two enantiomers, but has only been studied as the racemic mix.

== See also ==
- Olanzapine
