= NDMC =

NDMC may refer to:

- N-Desmethylclozapine
- National Drought Mitigation Center
- New Delhi Municipal Council, India
- North Delhi Municipal Corporation, India
- National Defence Medical Centre, Canada
- National Defense Medical Center, Taiwan
- National Disaster Management Centre, South Africa
- Notre Dame of Midsayap College, Philippines
