= Dibenzodiazepine =

Clozapine, an antipsychotic and example of a dibenzodiazepine.

A dibenzodiazepine, also known as a dibenzo[b,e][1,4]diazepine, is a tricyclic chemical compound. Derivatives of dibenzodiazepine, or substituted dibenzodiazepines, include the antipsychotic clozapine, the antihistamine clobenzepam, and the tricyclic antidepressant dibenzepin, among others.
