= Flunixin =

NSAID analgesic veterinary drug

Clinical data
- AHFS/Drugs.com: International Drug Names
- ATCvet code: QM01AG90 (WHO)

Identifiers
- IUPAC name: 2-[[2-Methyl-3-(trifluoromethyl)phenyl]amino]pyridine-3-carboxylic acid
- CAS Number: 38677-85-9
- PubChem CID: 38081
- ChemSpider: 34911
- UNII: 356IB1O400
- KEGG: D04215
- ChEBI: CHEBI:76138
- ChEMBL: ChEMBL1652146
- CompTox Dashboard (EPA): DTXSID4048565
- ECHA InfoCard: 100.115.991

Chemical and physical data
- Formula: C_{14}H_{11}F_{3}N_{2}O_{2}
- Molar mass: 296.249 g·mol^{−1}
- 3D model (JSmol): Interactive image
- SMILES: CC1=C(C=CC=C1NC2=C(C=CC=N2)C(=O)O)C(F)(F)F
- InChI: InChI=1S/C14H11F3N2O2/c1-8-10(14(15,16)17)5-2-6-11(8)19-12-9(13(20)21)4-3-7-18-12/h2-7H,1H3,(H,18,19)(H,20,21); Key:NOOCSNJCXJYGPE-UHFFFAOYSA-N

Flunixin is a nonsteroidal anti-inflammatory drug (NSAID), analgesic, and antipyretic used in horses, cattle and pigs. It is often formulated as the meglumine salt. In the United States, it is regulated by the U.S. Food and Drug Administration (FDA), and may only be lawfully distributed by order of a licensed veterinarian. There are many trade names for the product.

== Dosage and uses in horses ==
Flunixin is administered at a dose of 1.1 mg/kg. The full analgesic and antipyretic effects usually occur 1–2 hours following treatment, but there is often an effective analgesic effect within approximately 15 minutes. Despite its short plasma half life of 1.6–2.5 hours, effects can persist for up to 30 hours, with maximal effects occurring between 2 and 16 hours. This is likely due to accumulation of the drug at inflammatory foci. Flunixin is primarily eliminated by the kidneys.

Because it targets the inflamed tissue, flunixin is mainly used for colic pain, musculoskeletal pain, and ocular pain. It is also used as an antipyretic and to reduce the effects of endotoxemia.

== Side effects and precautions ==
Flunixin is labeled for no more than 5 days of consecutive use and prolonged use increases the risk of toxicity. In horses, this includes gastric ulcers, right dorsal colitis, and nephrotoxicity.

Flunixin is a prohibited substance under International Federation for Equestrian Sports rules, and its use is prohibited or restricted by many other equestrian organizations. At labeled dose (1.1 mg/kg) given IV, detection time was found to be 144 hours. However, drug recycling from bedding contamination by treated horses has been shown to potentially increase the clearance time.

== Administration ==
Flunixin may be given orally as a paste, as granules in feed, or intravenously(IV). It is strongly recommended that it not be administered intramuscularly (IM) as it is very irritating to tissue and IM administration has been associated with myonecrosis in horses, so IV administration is preferred.

Administration of phenylbutazone to a horse also receiving flunixin has been shown to increase the risk of toxicity without improving analgesia. For this reason, concurrent administration with another NSAID is not recommended. Doubling the dose of flunixin produces no improvement in analgesia, while potentially increasing the risk of toxicity.

In the US, the only labeled route for flunixin administration in cattle is intravenous and pour-on. This is not the case in other countries; for example, in the UK, Allevenix is licensed for IV and intramuscular use, and a pour-on product also exists.

In the US flunixin is not labelled for goat use, however, flunixin may be used in goats in an extra-label fashion under appropriate veterinary guidance. Flunixin administered subcutaneously to dairy goats may carry a milk withdraw recommendation of 36-60 hours. Interestingly, when given subcutaneously to goats in that study, tissue injury, such as seen in horses with intramuscular administration, was not observed.

== See also ==
- Clonixin
