= Emanuel Kaspar =

German organic chemist (1915–1971)

- Born: 25 July 1915
- Died: 6 February 1971 (aged 55)
- Scientific career
- Fields: Organic chemistry
- Institutions: Schering AG

Emanuel Kaspar (born 25 July 1915 in Berlin, died 6 February 1971 in Kamen) was a German organic chemist. He is known for inventing and patenting the synthesis of clocortolone with Rainer Philippson in 1973. The original assignee of the patent was Schering AG. Kaspar held a PhD (Dr.rer.nat.) and worked as a researcher at Schering AG. He was also a co-inventor of several other patents held by Schering. He married fellow chemist Elisabeth Barbara Hilda Vogt von Hunoltstein (born 1923) in Wiesbaden in 1948.
