= Rainer Philippson =

German organic chemist

- Scientific career
- Fields: Organic chemistry
- Institutions: German Academy of Sciences at Berlin; Schering AG

Rainer Philippson was a German organic chemist. He is known for inventing and patenting the synthesis of clocortolone with Emanuel Kaspar in 1973. The original assignee of the patent was Schering AG. Philippson held a PhD (Dr.rer.nat.) and worked as a researcher at the German Academy of Sciences at Berlin (in East Berlin) in the 1950s and 1960s. In the 1960s, he defected to West Germany and joined Schering AG as a researcher. Philippson was also a co-inventor of several other patents held by Schering.
