= Desmethylclozapine =

Active metabolite of the drug clozapine

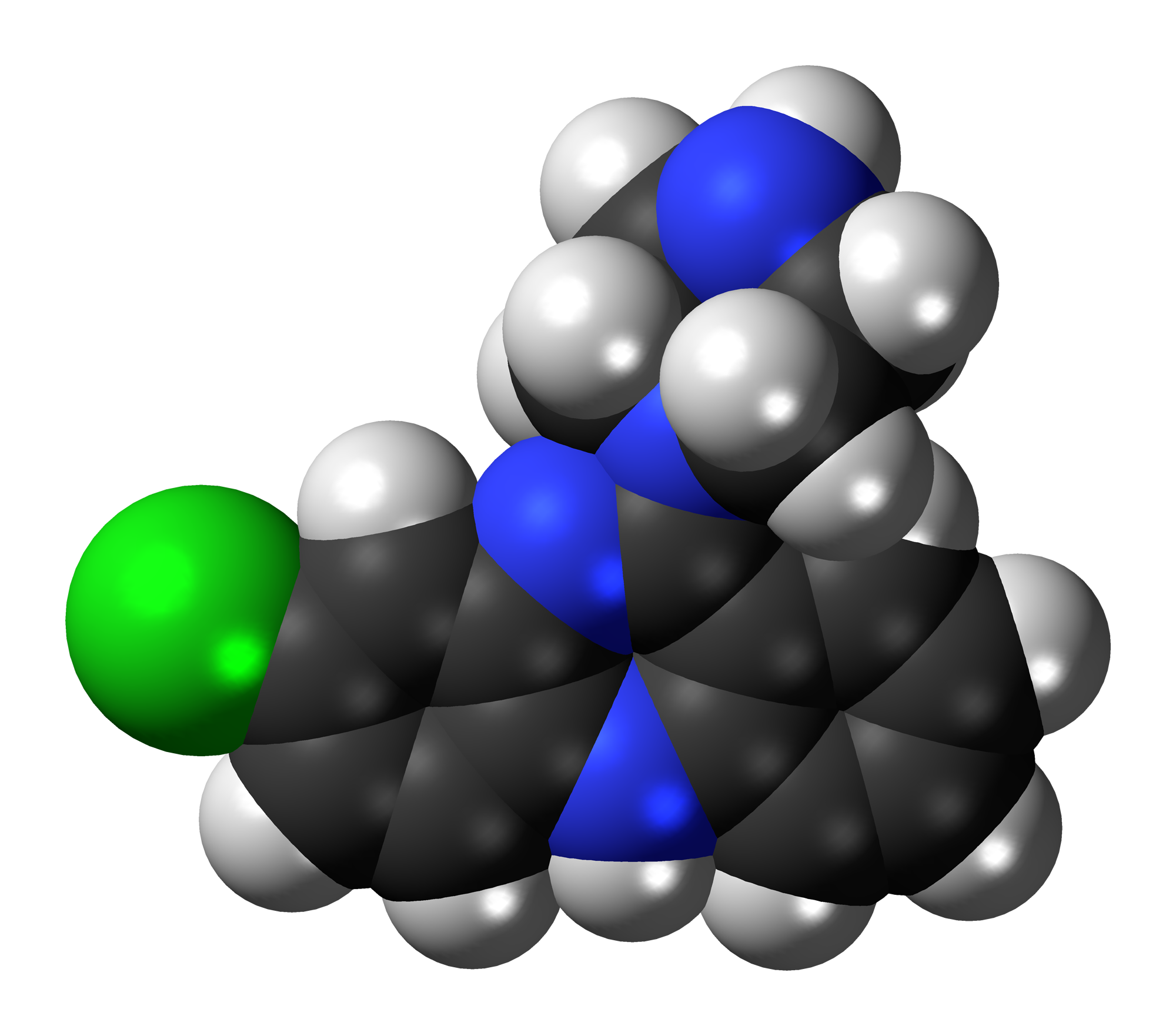

Clinical data
- Routes of administration: Oral
- ATC code: none

Legal status
- Legal status: In general: uncontrolled

Identifiers
- IUPAC name: 8-chloro-11-piperazin-1-yl-5H-dibenzo[b,e][1,4]diazepine
- CAS Number: 6104-71-8
- PubChem CID: 2820
- IUPHAR/BPS: 333
- ChemSpider: 14126465
- UNII: 1I9001LWY8
- ChEMBL: ChEMBL845
- CompTox Dashboard (EPA): DTXSID0042616
- ECHA InfoCard: 100.164.220

Chemical and physical data
- Formula: C_{17}H_{17}ClN_{4}
- Molar mass: 312.80 g·mol^{−1}
- 3D model (JSmol): Interactive image
- SMILES: C1CN(CCN1)C2=NC3=C(C=CC(=C3)Cl)NC4=CC=CC=C42

N-Desmethylclozapine (NDMC), or norclozapine, is a major active metabolite of the atypical antipsychotic drug clozapine.

Unlike clozapine, it possesses intrinsic activity at the D_{2}/D_{3} receptors, and acts as a weak partial agonist at these sites similarly to aripiprazole and bifeprunox. Notably, NDMC has also been shown to act as a potent and efficacious agonist at the muscarinic acetylcholine M_{1} receptor and the δ-opioid receptor, unlike clozapine as well. It is a moderate-efficacy partial agonist of the muscarinic acetylcholine M_{1} and M_{2} receptors, a very weak partial agonist or antagonist of the M_{3} receptor, and a silent antagonist of the M_{4} receptor. It also binds with high affinity to the M_{5} receptor, but its intrinsic activity was not reported for this receptor.

It was hypothesized that on account of its unique actions, NDMC might underlie the clinical superiority of clozapine over other antipsychotics. However, clinical trials found NMDC itself ineffective in the treatment of schizophrenia. This may be because it possesses relatively low D_{2}/D_{3} occupancy compared to the 5-HT_{2} receptor (<15% versus 64–79% at a dose of 10–60 mg/kg s.c. in animal studies).

Albeit not useful in the treatment of positive symptoms on its own, it cannot be ruled out that NDMC may contribute to the efficacy of clozapine on cognitive and/or negative symptoms.

== See also ==
- Clozapine
- DHA-clozapine
- Loxapine
