= Clofezone =

Chemical compound

Structures of clofexamide and phenylbutazone

Combination of
- Clofexamide: Antidepressant
- Phenylbutazone: Nonsteroidal anti-inflammatory drug

Clinical data
- Trade names: Perclusone
- Routes of administration: Oral, rectal, topical
- ATC code: M02AA03 (WHO) M01AA05 (WHO)

Legal status
- Legal status: Discontinued

Identifiers
- CAS Number: 17449-96-6
- PubChem CID: 6433695
- ChemSpider: 4938775
- UNII: 5RB28NE79Y
- CompTox Dashboard (EPA): DTXSID30169831
- ECHA InfoCard: 100.037.681

Clofezone (trade name Perclusone) is a drug that was used to treat joint and muscular pain, but is not marketed any more. It is a combination of clofexamide, an antidepressant, and phenylbutazone, a nonsteroidal anti-inflammatory drug (NSAID).
