= Clenoliximab =

Monoclonal antibody

Monoclonal antibody
- Type: Whole antibody
- Source: Chimeric (primate/human)
- Target: CD4

Clinical data
- ATC code: none

Identifiers
- CAS Number: 182912-58-9
- DrugBank: DB06241
- ChemSpider: none
- UNII: 78EVW7GX37

Clenoliximab (INN) is a monoclonal antibody against CD4. It acts as an immunomodulator and has been investigated for the treatment of rheumatoid arthritis. The drug is a chimeric antibody from Macaca irus and Homo sapiens.
