= Clonixin =

Nonsteroidal anti-inflammatory drug (NSAID)

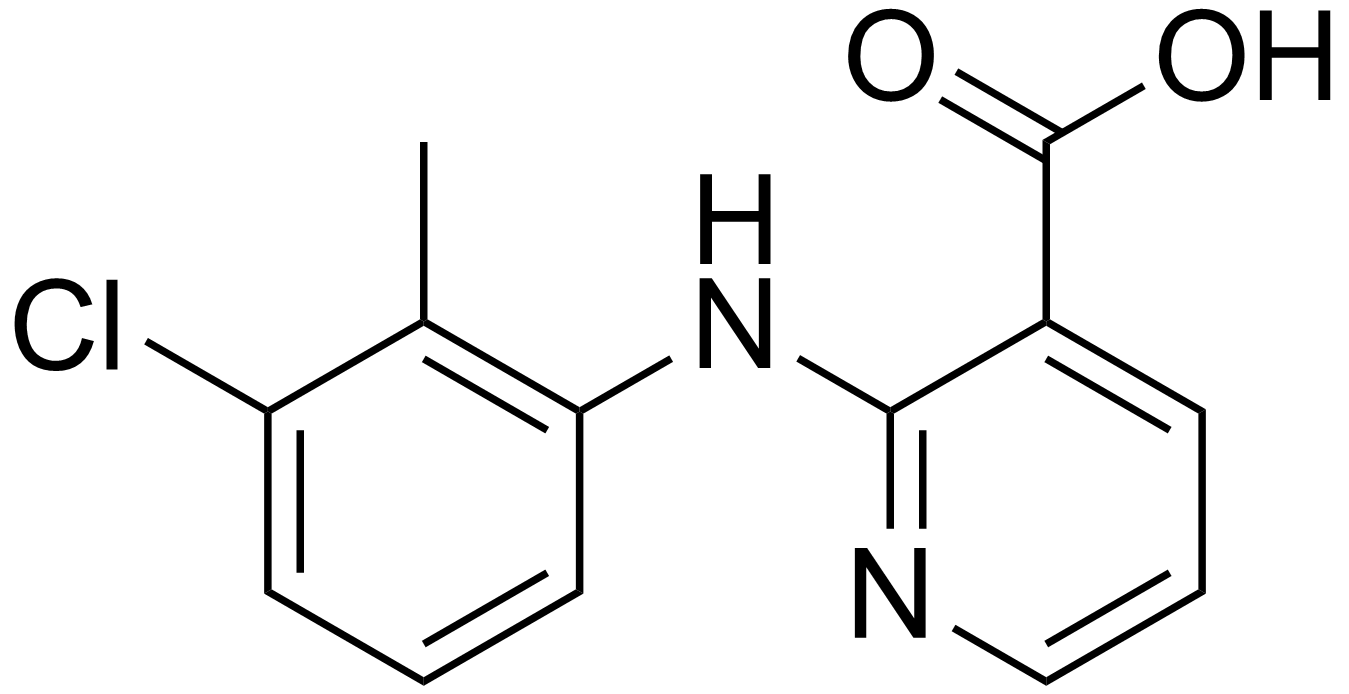

Names
- Preferred IUPAC name 2-(3-Chloro-2-methylanilino)pyridine-3-carboxylic acid
- Other names Clonixic acid; CBA 93626

Identifiers
CAS Number	17737-65-4
3D model (JSmol)	Interactive image
ChEBI	CHEBI:76200
ChEMBL	ChEMBL1332971
ChemSpider	26711
ECHA InfoCard	100.037.921
KEGG	D03555
PubChem CID	28718
UNII	V7DXN0M42R
CompTox Dashboard (EPA)	DTXSID2046121
- InChI: InChI=1S/C13H11ClN2O2/c1-8-10(14)5-2-6-11(8)16-12-9(13(17)18)4-3-7-15-12/h2-7H,1H3,(H,15,16)(H,17,18) Key: CLOMYZFHNHFSIQ-UHFFFAOYSA-N; InChI=1/C13H11ClN2O2/c1-8-10(14)5-2-6-11(8)16-12-9(13(17)18)4-3-7-15-12/h2-7H,1H3,(H,15,16)(H,17,18) Key: CLOMYZFHNHFSIQ-UHFFFAOYAG
- SMILES: O=C(O)C1=CC=CN=C1NC2=C(C)C(Cl)=CC=C2

Properties
Chemical formula	C_{13}H_{11}ClN_{2}O_{2}
Molar mass	262.69 g·mol^{−1}

Pharmacology
Routes of administration	per os
- Pharmacokinetics
Metabolism	Glucuronidation via UGT2B7
Legal status	US: Not sold in the U.S.
- Except where otherwise noted, data are given for materials in their standard state (at 25 °C [77 °F], 100 kPa). verify (what is ?) Infobox references

Clonixin is a nonsteroidal anti-inflammatory drug (NSAID). It also has analgesic, antipyretic, and platelet-inhibitory actions. It is used primarily in the treatment of chronic arthritic conditions and certain soft tissue disorders associated with pain and inflammation.

== Synthesis ==
Clonixin synthesis: M. H. Sherlock, N. Sperber, BE 679271; eidem, U.S. patent 3,337,570 (1966, 1967 both to Schering).

== Clonixeril ==
The glyceryl ester of clonixin, clonixeril, is also an NSAID. It was prepared by a somewhat roundabout method.

Clonixeril synthesis:

Clonixin was reacted with chloroacetonitrile and triethylamine to give 2. Heating with potassium carbonate and glycerol acetonide displaced the activating group to produce ester 3, which was deblocked in acetic acid to produce clonixeril (4).

== See also ==
- Flunixin
