= Clobenztropine =

Chemical compound

Clinical data
- ATC code: none

Identifiers
- IUPAC name: 3-[(4-chlorophenyl)-phenylmethoxy]-8-methyl-8-azabicyclo[3.2.1]octane
- CAS Number: 5627-46-3
- PubChem CID: 1687
- ChemSpider: 10221075
- UNII: M8CDT278F8
- ChEMBL: ChEMBL2146132
- CompTox Dashboard (EPA): DTXSID5043897

Chemical and physical data
- Formula: C_{21}H_{24}ClNO
- Molar mass: 341.88 g·mol^{−1}
- 3D model (JSmol): Interactive image
- SMILES: CN4[C@@H]1CC[C@H]4C[C@H](C1)OC(c2ccccc2)c3ccc(Cl)cc3

Clobenztropine is an antihistamine.
