= Clofenetamine =

Antihistamine and anticholinergic

Clinical data
- Other names: Phenoxethamine; Keithon
- Drug class: Tranquilizer; Antihistamine; Anticholinergic; Antiparkinsonian agent

Identifiers
- IUPAC name: 2-[1-(4-chlorophenyl)-1-phenylethoxy]-N,N-diethylethanamine
- CAS Number: 511-46-6 2019-16-1 (hydrochloride)
- PubChem CID: 71812
- ChemSpider: 64836
- UNII: 5YH9CQF0FP
- ChEMBL: ChEMBL2110777
- CompTox Dashboard (EPA): DTXSID20862081

Chemical and physical data
- Formula: C_{20}H_{26}ClNO
- Molar mass: 331.88 g·mol^{−1}
- 3D model (JSmol): Interactive image
- SMILES: CCN(CC)CCOC(C)(C1=CC=CC=C1)C2=CC=C(C=C2)Cl
- InChI: InChI=1S/C20H26ClNO/c1-4-22(5-2)15-16-23-20(3,17-9-7-6-8-10-17)18-11-13-19(21)14-12-18/h6-14H,4-5,15-16H2,1-3H3; Key:IKFQEQVEOQNTRJ-UHFFFAOYSA-N

Clofenetamine (INN), also known as phenoxethamine or as Keithon, is a drug described as a tranquilizer, antihistamine, anticholinergic, and antiparkinsonian agent. It is a derivative of diphenhydramine and is closely structurally related to mephenhydramine, chlorphenoxamine, and embramine, among other drugs. Clofenetamine was discovered by Searle in the 1940s and was first described in the literature by 1956.
