= Clocortolone pivalate =

Chemical compound

Clinical data
- Trade names: Cilder, Cloderm, Purantix
- Other names: Clocortolone trimethylacetate; CL-68; SH-863; 9α-Chloro-6α-fluoro-11β,21-dihydroxy-16α-methylpregna-1,4-diene-3,20-dione 21-pivalate
- Drug class: Corticosteroid; Glucocorticoid

Identifiers
- IUPAC name: [2-[(6S,8S,9R,10S,11S,13S,14S,16R,17S)-9-Chloro-6-fluoro-11-hydroxy-10,13,16-trimethyl-3-oxo-7,8,11,12,14,15,16,17-octahydro-6H-cyclopenta[a]phenanthren-17-yl]-2-oxoethyl] 2,2-dimethylpropanoate
- CAS Number: 34097-16-0
- PubChem CID: 5282493
- ChemSpider: 4445634
- UNII: QBL8IZH14X
- KEGG: D02287
- ChEBI: CHEBI:59583
- ChEMBL: ChEMBL1200975
- CompTox Dashboard (EPA): DTXSID0045460
- ECHA InfoCard: 100.047.099

Chemical and physical data
- Formula: C_{27}H_{36}ClFO_{5}
- Molar mass: 495.03 g·mol^{−1}
- 3D model (JSmol): Interactive image
- SMILES: C[C@@H]1C[C@H]2[C@@H]3C[C@@H](C4=CC(=O)C=C[C@@]4([C@]3([C@H](C[C@@]2([C@H]1C(=O)COC(=O)C(C)(C)C)C)O)Cl)C)F
- InChI: InChI=1S/C27H36ClFO5/c1-14-9-16-17-11-19(29)18-10-15(30)7-8-26(18,6)27(17,28)21(32)12-25(16,5)22(14)20(31)13-34-23(33)24(2,3)4/h7-8,10,14,16-17,19,21-22,32H,9,11-13H2,1-6H3/t14-,16+,17+,19+,21+,22-,25+,26+,27+/m1/s1; Key:SXYZQZLHAIHKKY-GSTUPEFVSA-N

Clocortolone pivalate (brand names Cilder, Cloderm, Purantix), also known as clocortolone trimethylacetate, is a synthetic glucocorticoid corticosteroid and corticosteroid ester which is marketed in the United States and Austria. It is the C21 pivalate (trimethylacetate) ester of clocortolone, and acts as a prodrug of clocortolone in the body.
