= Cloticasone =

Chemical compound

Clinical data
- Other names: 6α,9α-Difluoro-11β,17α-dihydroxy-16α-methyl-21-thia-21-chloromethylpregna-1,4-dien-3,20-dione; S-(Chloromethyl) 6α,9α-difluoro-11beta,17α-dihydroxy-16α-methyl-3-oxoandrosta-1,4-diene-17β-carbothioate
- Drug class: Corticosteroid; Glucocorticoid

Identifiers
- IUPAC name: S-(Chloromethyl) (6S,8S,9R,10S,11S,13S,14S,16R,17R)-6,9-difluoro-11,17-dihydroxy-10,13,16-trimethyl-3-oxo-6,7,8,11,12,14,15,16-octahydrocyclopenta[a]phenanthrene-17-carbothioate
- CAS Number: 87556-66-9
- PubChem CID: 44481798
- ChemSpider: 21476738
- UNII: 6CN32ZUQ4X
- CompTox Dashboard (EPA): DTXSID10236459

Chemical and physical data
- Formula: C_{22}H_{27}ClF_{2}O_{4}S
- Molar mass: 460.96 g·mol^{−1}
- 3D model (JSmol): Interactive image
- SMILES: C[C@@H]1C[C@H]2[C@@H]3C[C@@H](C4=CC(=O)C=C[C@@]4([C@]3([C@H](C[C@@]2([C@]1(C(=O)SCCl)O)C)O)F)C)F
- InChI: InChI=1S/C22H27ClF2O4S/c1-11-6-13-14-8-16(24)15-7-12(26)4-5-19(15,2)21(14,25)17(27)9-20(13,3)22(11,29)18(28)30-10-23/h4-5,7,11,13-14,16-17,27,29H,6,8-10H2,1-3H3/t11-,13+,14+,16+,17+,19+,20+,21+,22+/m1/s1; Key:ANLWAEZHUOEOTI-GQKYHHCASA-N

Cloticasone is a synthetic glucocorticoid corticosteroid which was never marketed.
