= Clocortolone =

Pharmaceutical drug

Clocortolone pivalate

Clinical data
- Trade names: Cloderm
- AHFS/Drugs.com: Consumer Drug Information
- Routes of administration: Topical
- ATC code: D07AB21 (WHO)

Legal status
- Legal status: US: ℞-only

Identifiers
- IUPAC name: [2-(9-Chloro-6-fluoro-11-hydroxy-10,13,16-trimethyl-3-oxo-7,8,11,12,14,15,16,17-octahydro-6H-cyclopenta[a]phenanthren-17-yl)-2-oxo-ethyl] 2,2-dimethylpropanoate
- CAS Number: 4828-27-7
- PubChem CID: 5282493
- DrugBank: DB00838
- ChemSpider: 4445634
- UNII: N8ZUB7XE0H
- KEGG: D02287
- ChEBI: CHEBI:59583
- ChEMBL: ChEMBL1201366
- CompTox Dashboard (EPA): DTXSID901333489
- ECHA InfoCard: 100.023.096

Chemical and physical data
- Formula: C_{27}H_{36}ClFO_{5}
- Molar mass: 495.03 g·mol^{−1}
- 3D model (JSmol): Interactive image
- SMILES: O=C(OCC(=O)[C@@H]3[C@]2(C[C@H](O)[C@]4(Cl)[C@@]/1(\C(=C/C(=O)\C=C\1)[C@@H](F)C[C@H]4[C@@H]2C[C@H]3C)C)C)C(C)(C)C
- InChI: InChI=1S/C27H36ClFO5/c1-14-9-16-17-11-19(29)18-10-15(30)7-8-26(18,6)27(17,28)21(32)12-25(16,5)22(14)20(31)13-34-23(33)24(2,3)4/h7-8,10,14,16-17,19,21-22,32H,9,11-13H2,1-6H3/t14-,16+,17+,19+,21+,22-,25+,26+,27+/m1/s1; Key:SXYZQZLHAIHKKY-GSTUPEFVSA-N

Clocortolone (Cloderm) is a topical steroid. It is used in the form of an ester, clocortolone pivalate, and applied as a cream. It is used for the treatment of dermatitis and is considered a medium-strength corticosteroid. It is unusual among steroids in that it contains a chlorine atom and a fluorine atom.

== Pharmacology ==
Clocortolone is an upper-mid potency topical corticosteroid formulation. It is rated at a class 4 potency on a scale of 1 (highest potency) to 7 (lowest potency). Most patients are treated with mid-potency topical corticosteroids, for they are an effective medium between safety and efficacy for short and long-term conditions.

Vital to the pharmacological action of clocortolone is the presence and location of its functional groups. There were several molecular modifications done to create clocortolone pivalate, including beta-hydroxylation at C-11, methylation at C-16, double bonds at C-12, esterification at C-21, and halogenation at C-6 and C-9. It is common in the medical community to associate halogenation of topical corticosteroids with adverse effects. This notion is, in fact, incorrect—it is both the presence and location of halogenation in steroids that matter. In comparison to all other topical corticosteroids, the combination of the chlorine at C-9 and the fluorine at C-6 is unique to clocortolone. Clocortolone pivalate, due to its unique nature, has both upper-mid potency and the safety profile associated with a lower potency topical corticosteroid. This versatility allows for Cloderm cream to be a treatment option for a variety of patients.

== Cream vehicle ==
Clocortolone pivalate 0.1% is formulated in a cream that contains three ingredients which assist in stratum corneum permeability barrier integrity: white petrolatum (occlusive), mineral oil (humectant), and stearyl alcohol (long-chain fatty alcohol emollient). This cream does not contain lanolin, fragrance, nor propylene glycol, all of which have been known to be problematic for some patients.

== Clinical studies ==
In Phase III trials, Cloderm was found to be especially useful in treating eczema, atopic dermatitis, and psoriasis. Phase III trials also showed rapid action and relief for the majority of the patients involved. There is no age restriction on the use of clocortolone pivalate 0.1% cream. Clinical trials comparing clocortolone pivalate 0.1% topical cream with vehicle in atopic dermatitis/eczematous dermatitis, psoriasis, and contact dermatitis included pediatric patients (N=44). The mean age of pediatric subjects was 10 years (range 3–14 years). Clocortolone pivalate 0.1% cream was efficacious for the majority (75%) of the pediatric patients in these trials, with no serious adverse effects occurring in either group.

In six parallel, double-blind, placebo-controlled trials, patients with atopic dermatitis/eczematous dermatitis were randomized to treatment with clocortolone pivalate 0.1% topical cream (total n=109) or vehicle (total n=100), applied three times daily over a duration of 14 days. According to evaluations completed by the physician investigators, a significantly higher proportion of patients in the clocortolone pivalate group than patients in the vehicle group demonstrated a good or excellent response at Days 4, 7, and 14.

Due to the chronic and lengthy nature of some steroid responsive dermatoses such as atopic dermatitis and psoriasis, a study of 27 patients was conducted, wherein these patients were treated with Cloderm from 30 days up to 7 months. The results of these treatments showed a low rate of adverse reactions and no signs of striae, atrophy, or hypopigmentation. Adverse reactions that were experienced included burning, itching, irritation, dryness, and/or folliculitis.

Additionally, a clinical study investigated the potential of hypothalamic–pituitary–adrenal (HPA) axis suppression. Ten men with no major health issues applied 30g of clocortolone pivalate 0.1% cream twice a day for 21 days while wearing a plastic sweat suit for twelve hours per day. Through the measurements of plasma cortisol and urinary 17-ketosteroid levels, the investigators monitored effects on the HPA axis, and no signs of adrenal suppression were evident.

In total to date, 559 patients have participated in clinical trials involving Cloderm, and there was little evidence of local and/or systemic adverse effects. Specifically, only 4.4 percent experienced adverse events, most of which were local application-site reactions, such as dryness, stinging, burning, or itching.

== Regulation history ==
Cloderm, the brand formulation of clocortolone pivalate 0.1% cream, was approved by the Food and Drug Administration in 1977 for the treatment of corticoid responsive dermatoses.

== Commercialization ==
=== Manufacturing process ===
Clocortolone is synthesized by the reaction of 6α-fluoro-16α-methyl-21-hydroxy-1,4,9(11)-pregnatriene-3,20-dione with tert-butyl hypochlorite.

=== Commercialization history ===
The synthesis of clocortolone was invented and patented by Emanuel Kaspar and Rainer Philippson in 1973 with United States Patent 3,729,495. The original assignee of the patent was Schering AG, a research-centered German pharmaceutical company. The rights to Clocortolone were then sold to Germapharm, and then to Coria Laboratories, Ltd. of DFB Pharmaceuticals, Inc., a Fort Worth-based pharmaceutical company. Coria Laboratories, Ltd., the dermatology division of DFB Pharmaceuticals, Inc., was then sold to Valeant Pharmaceuticals in 2008. In 2011, Promius Pharma, LLC, an affiliate of Dr. Reddy's Laboratories, and Valeant Pharmaceuticals International, Inc. announced that they had signed a joint agreement for Cloderm. Per this collaborative agreement, Promius Pharma made an upfront payment will continue to pay royalties as the consideration for the right to manufacture, distribute and market Cloderm in the United States.

=== Price listing ===
In August 2016 Cloderm Cream 0.1% clocortolone pivalate was priced at $3.64 per gram and $140.98 per 45 gm tube.

== See also ==
- Budesonide
