= Clodazon =

Antidepressant

Clinical data
- Other names: AW 14'2446

Identifiers
- CAS Number: 4755-59-3
- PubChem CID: 20883
- ChemSpider: 19652
- UNII: X82H6JOC4H
- ChEMBL: ChEMBL2110801
- CompTox Dashboard (EPA): DTXSID30197194

Chemical and physical data
- Formula: C_{22}H_{25}N_{3}O_{3}
- Molar mass: 379.460 g·mol^{−1}
- 3D model (JSmol): Interactive image
- SMILES: CN(C)CCCN1C2=C(C=C(C=C2)Cl)N(C1=O)C3=CC=CC=C3
- InChI: InChI=1S/C18H20ClN3O/c1-20(2)11-6-12-21-16-10-9-14(19)13-17(16)22(18(21)23)15-7-4-3-5-8-15/h3-5,7-10,13H,6,11-12H2,1-2H3; Key:VWXGRWMELBPMCU-UHFFFAOYSA-N

Clodazon (AW 142446) is an antidepressant drug investigated in Germany in the 1960s. In animal models, clodazon inhibits the catalepsy induced by tetrabenazine and it potentiates the effect of catecholamines, both effects being of the order experienced with imipramine. In clinical trials, about 2/3 of the patients showed a positive antidepressive effect with few side effects.

Pharmacology:

== Synthesis ==
The synthesis of clodazon is delineated in the patent:

Clodazon synthesis

5-Chloro-2-nitrodiphenylamine [25781-92-4] (1) is reduced to 5-chloro-N-phenylbenzene-1,2-diamine [68406-47-3] (2). Treatment of this with phosgene (caution) would give 3-phenyl-5-chloro-benzimidazolin-2-one [54986-47-9] (3). Base catalyzed treatment of this with 1-bromo-3-chloropropane provided PC20506309 (structure not shown). Displacement of the remaining halogen atom leaving group by dimethylamine completes the construction of sidechain and thus the synthesis of clodazon (4).

[54986-47-9] ~98%:~90%:

The crystal structure is monoclinic with space group P2_{1}/c with unit cell parameters a=5.898 b=31.911 c=10.817 Å with β=103.52°. Unit cell volume is 1989.3 Å^{3}.
