= Clentiazem =

Names
- Preferred IUPAC name (2S,3S)-8-Chloro-5-[2-(dimethylamino)ethyl]-2-(4-methoxyphenyl)-4-oxo-2,3,4,5-tetrahydro-1,5-benzothiazepin-3-yl acetate

Identifiers
CAS Number	96125-53-0
3D model (JSmol)	Interactive image
ChemSpider	51418
PubChem CID	57026
UNII	40DK034DRC
CompTox Dashboard (EPA)	DTXSID901028074
- InChI: InChI=1S/C22H25ClN2O4S/c1-14(26)29-20-21(15-5-8-17(28-4)9-6-15)30-19-13-16(23)7-10-18(19)25(22(20)27)12-11-24(2)3/h5-10,13,20-21H,11-12H2,1-4H3/t20-,21+/m1/s1 Key: GYKFWCDBQAFCLJ-RTWAWAEBSA-N; InChI=1/C22H25ClN2O4S/c1-14(26)29-20-21(15-5-8-17(28-4)9-6-15)30-19-13-16(23)7-10-18(19)25(22(20)27)12-11-24(2)3/h5-10,13,20-21H,11-12H2,1-4H3/t20-,21+/m1/s1 Key: GYKFWCDBQAFCLJ-RTWAWAEBBL
- SMILES: CC(=O)OC1C(SC2=C(C=CC(=C2)Cl)N(C1=O)CCN(C)C)C3=CC=C(C=C3)OC

Properties
Chemical formula	C_{22}H_{25}ClN_{2}O_{4}S
Molar mass	448.9629
- Except where otherwise noted, data are given for materials in their standard state (at 25 °C [77 °F], 100 kPa). verify (what is ?) Infobox references

Clentiazem is a calcium channel blocker.

It is a chlorine derivative of diltiazem.
