= Chlordantoin =

Antifungal medication

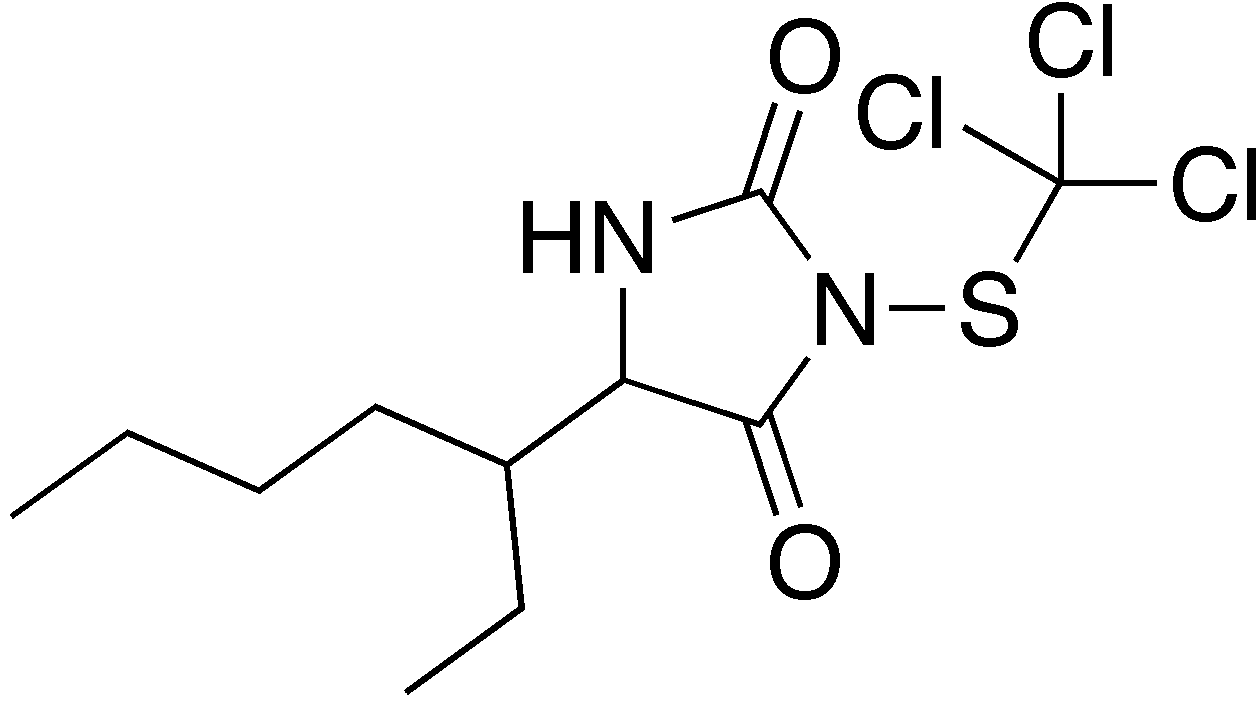

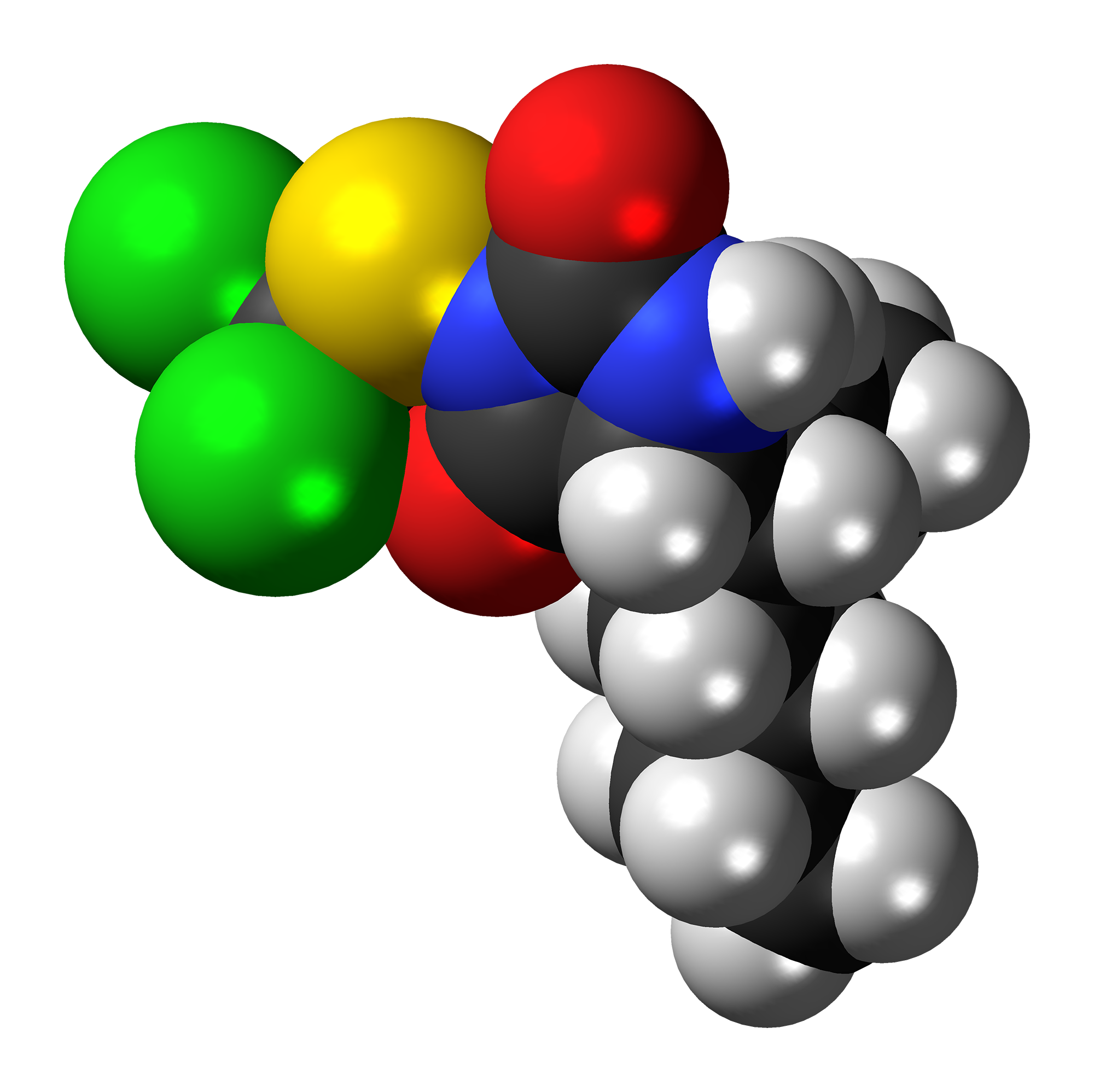

Clinical data
- Other names: Clodantoin
- ATC code: G01AX01 (WHO)

Identifiers
- IUPAC name: 5-Heptan-3-yl-3-(trichloromethylsulfanyl)imidazolidine-2,4-dione
- CAS Number: 5588-20-5
- PubChem CID: 21782
- ChemSpider: 20472
- UNII: W14Z7581PA
- KEGG: D03462
- ChEMBL: ChEMBL356479
- CompTox Dashboard (EPA): DTXSID40863575
- ECHA InfoCard: 100.024.542

Chemical and physical data
- Formula: C_{11}H_{17}Cl_{3}N_{2}O_{2}S
- Molar mass: 347.68 g·mol^{−1}
- 3D model (JSmol): Interactive image
- SMILES: O=C1NC(C(=O)N1SC(Cl)(Cl)Cl)C(CC)CCCC

Chlordantoin (clodantoin) is an antifungal drug used in gynecology.
