= Clofexamide =

Chemical compound

Clinical data
- Routes of administration: Oral, rectal, topical
- ATC code: None

Legal status
- Legal status: Discontinued

Identifiers
- IUPAC name: 2-(4-Chlorophenoxy)-N-[2-(diethylamino)ethyl]acetamide
- CAS Number: 1223-36-5
- PubChem CID: 28554
- ChemSpider: 26562
- UNII: 071P4J77HF
- ChEMBL: ChEMBL2106515
- CompTox Dashboard (EPA): DTXSID6046424
- ECHA InfoCard: 100.013.592

Chemical and physical data
- Formula: C_{14}H_{21}ClN_{2}O_{2}
- Molar mass: 284.78 g·mol^{−1}
- 3D model (JSmol): Interactive image
- SMILES: CCN(CC)CCNC(=O)COC1=CC=C(C=C1)Cl
- InChI: InChI=1S/C14H21ClN2O2/c1-3-17(4-2)10-9-16-14(18)11-19-13-7-5-12(15)6-8-13/h5-8H,3-4,9-11H2,1-2H3,(H,16,18); Key:UORGKWWJEQDTGX-UHFFFAOYSA-N

Clofexamide (or amichlophene) is an antidepressant that was a component of the drug combination clofezone, the other being the nonsteroidal anti-inflammatory drug (NSAID) phenylbutazone. Clofezone was used to treat joint and muscular pain, but is not marketed any more.
