= Clovoxamine =

Chemical compound

Clinical data
- Other names: DU-23811
- Routes of administration: Oral
- ATC code: none

Legal status
- Legal status: In general: uncontrolled

Identifiers
- IUPAC name: (E)-1-(4-chlorophenyl)-5-methoxy-1-pentanone O-(2-aminoethyl)oxime
- CAS Number: 54739-19-4; fumarate: 54739-21-8
- PubChem CID: 6335903
- ChemSpider: 4891461
- UNII: 7I22J7RY2A; fumarate: 21VG81S0IX
- ChEMBL: ChEMBL2105603
- CompTox Dashboard (EPA): DTXSID501023903

Chemical and physical data
- Formula: C_{14}H_{21}ClN_{2}O_{2}
- Molar mass: 284.78 g·mol^{−1}
- 3D model (JSmol): Interactive image
- SMILES: COCCCCC(=NOCCN)C1=CC=C(C=C1)Cl
- InChI: InChI=1S/C14H21ClN2O2/c1-18-10-3-2-4-14(17-19-11-9-16)12-5-7-13(15)8-6-12/h5-8H,2-4,9-11,16H2,1H3/b17-14+; Key:XXPVSQRPGBUFKM-SAPNQHFASA-N

Clovoxamine (INN; development code DU-23811) is a drug that was discovered in the 1970s and was subsequently investigated as an antidepressant and anxiolytic agent but was never marketed. It acts as a serotonin-norepinephrine reuptake inhibitor (SNRI), with little affinity for the muscarinic acetylcholine, histamine, adrenergic, and serotonin receptors. The compound is structurally related to fluvoxamine.
