= Clobenzepam =

Chemical compound

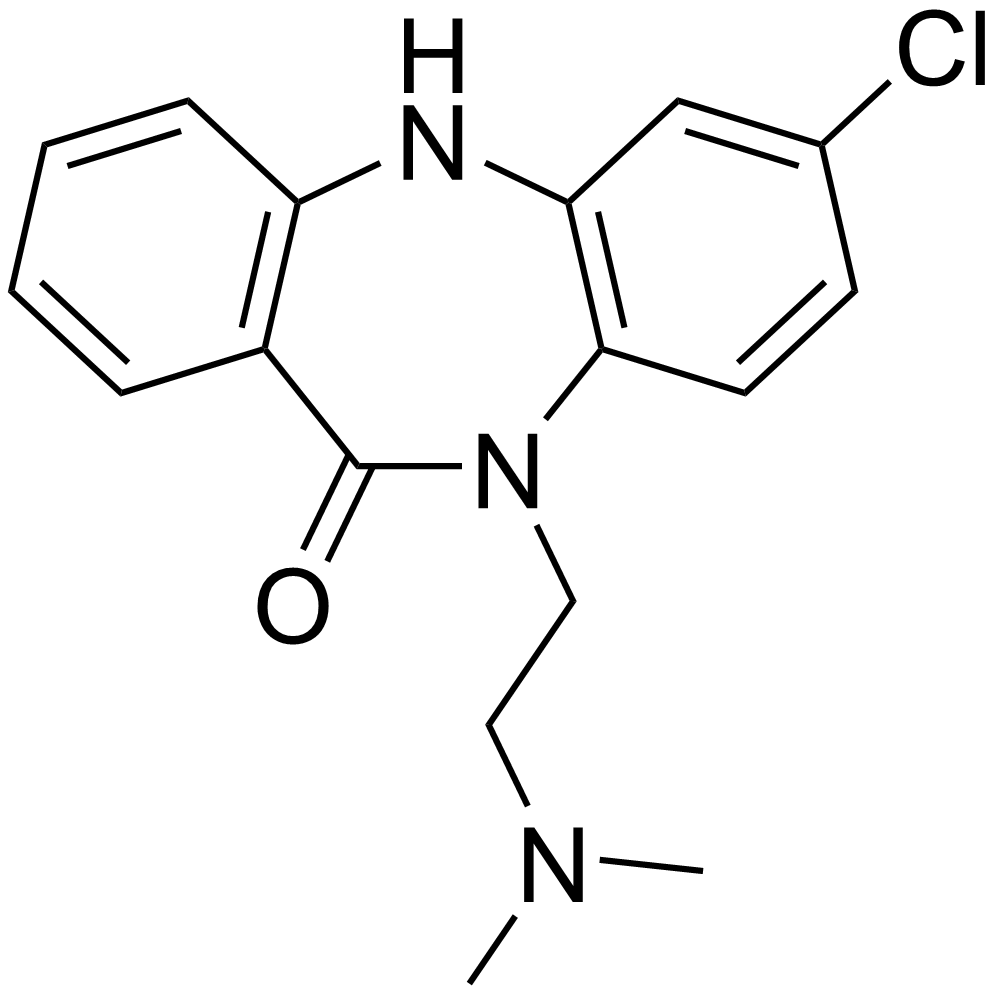

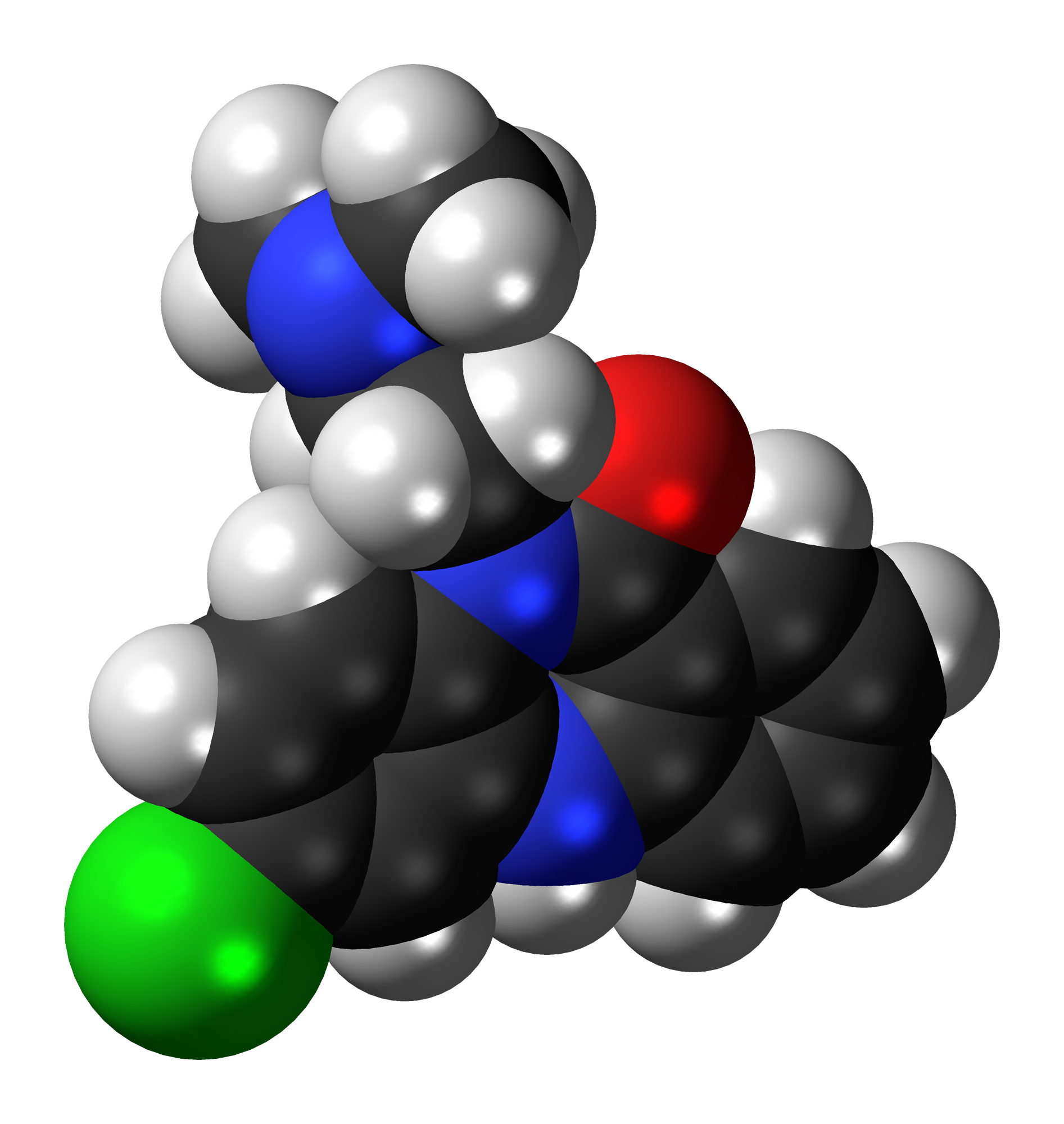

Clinical data
- AHFS/Drugs.com: International Drug Names
- ATC code: none

Identifiers
- IUPAC name: 2-Chloro-5-(2-dimethylaminoethyl)-11H-benzo[b][1,4]benzodiazepin-6-one
- CAS Number: 1159-93-9
- PubChem CID: 14396
- ChemSpider: 13752
- UNII: 0O6W0NP518
- ChEMBL: ChEMBL2104007
- CompTox Dashboard (EPA): DTXSID50151218

Chemical and physical data
- Formula: C_{17}H_{18}ClN_{3}O
- Molar mass: 315.80 g·mol^{−1}
- 3D model (JSmol): Interactive image
- SMILES: Clc3ccc2N(C(=O)c1c(cccc1)Nc2c3)CCN(C)C

Clobenzepam is an antihistamine and anticholinergic.
