= Cliropamine =

Clinical data
- Other names: Clipoxamine; D-16427; D-16,427
- Drug class: Sympathomimetic; Positive inotrope

Identifiers
- IUPAC name: 5-[(1R,2S)-1-hydroxy-2-(3-phenylpropylamino)propyl]-2-methylphenol
- CAS Number: 109525-44-2
- PubChem CID: 193996
- ChemSpider: 168337
- UNII: 87V8H2Q8IH
- CompTox Dashboard (EPA): DTXSID00883193

Chemical and physical data
- Formula: C_{19}H_{25}NO_{2}
- Molar mass: 299.414 g·mol^{−1}
- 3D model (JSmol): Interactive image
- SMILES: CC1=C(C=C(C=C1)[C@H]([C@H](C)NCCCC2=CC=CC=C2)O)O
- InChI: InChI=1S/C19H25NO2/c1-14-10-11-17(13-18(14)21)19(22)15(2)20-12-6-9-16-7-4-3-5-8-16/h3-5,7-8,10-11,13,15,19-22H,6,9,12H2,1-2H3/t15-,19-/m0/s1; Key:AUTKZDGLQYYXLZ-KXBFYZLASA-N

Cliropamine (INN; developmental code name D-16427) is a positive inotropic drug of the phenethylamine and amphetamine families which was never marketed. It was first described by 1986.
