= C14H10O =

The molecular formula C_{14}H_{10}O (molar mass: 194.23 g/mol) may refer to:

- Anthrone
- Anthrol
- Dibenzoxepin
- Diphenylketene
- 1-Hydroxyphenanthrene, a human metabolite of phenanthrene
- 2-Phenylbenzofuran
