= C18H17N3O2 =

The molecular formula C_{18}H_{17}N_{3}O_{2} (molar mass: 307.35 g/mol) may refer to:

- para-Aminoblebbistatin
- Anitrazafen
- Orteronel
