= C18H24N2O4 =

The molecular formula C_{18}H_{24}N_{2}O_{4} (molar mass: 332.39 g/mol, exact mass: 332.1736 u) may refer to:

- Ancarolol
- Isoxaben (N-[3-(1-ethyl-1-methylpropyl)-1,2-oxazol-5-yl]-2,6-dimethoxybenzamide)
