= Blebbistatin =

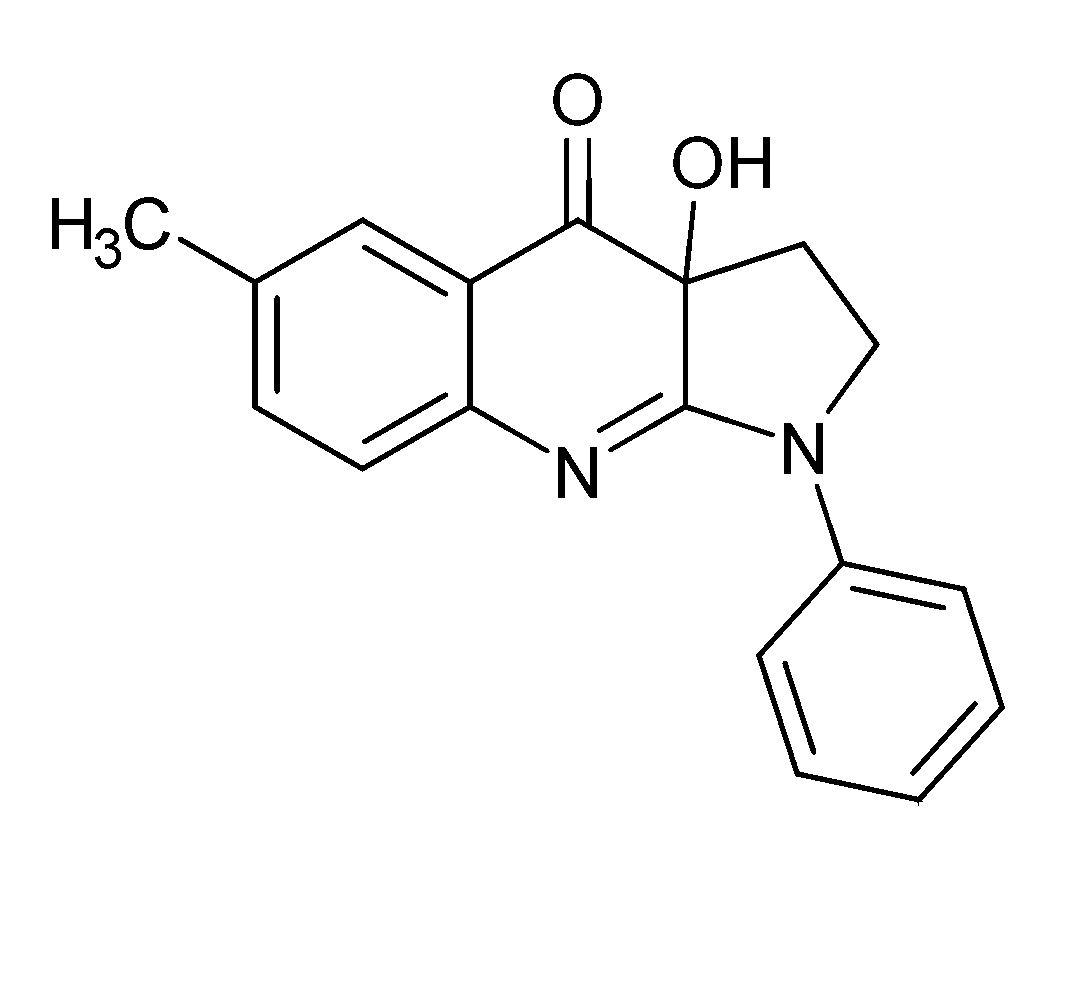

Names
- IUPAC name 3a-Hydroxy-6-methyl-1-phenyl-2,3-dihydropyrrolo[2,3-b]quinolin-4-one
- Other names (S)-Blebbistatin, (-)-Blebbistatin

Identifiers
| CAS Number | 856925-71-8 |
| 3D model (JSmol) | Interactive image |
| ChemSpider | 2718128; (+): 5037168; (−): 4450090 |
| PubChem CID | 3476986 |
| UNII | 8WII7624I5 |
| CompTox Dashboard (EPA) | DTXSID501017342 |
- InChI: InChI=1S/C18H16N2O2/c1-12-7-8-15-14(11-12)16(21)18(22)9-10-20(17(18)19-15)13-5-3-2-4-6-13/h2-8,11,22H,9-10H2,1H3 Key: LZAXPYOBKSJSEX-UHFFFAOYSA-N
- SMILES: CC1=CC2=C(C=C1)N=C3C(C2=O)(CCN3C4=CC=CC=C4)O

Properties
| Chemical formula | C_{18}H_{16}N_{2}O_{2} |
| Molar mass | 292.338 g·mol^{−1} |
| Appearance | Yellow solid |
| Solubility in water | 10 μM |
- Except where otherwise noted, data are given for materials in their standard state (at 25 °C [77 °F], 100 kPa). Infobox references

Blebbistatin is a myosin inhibitor mostly specific for myosin II. It is widely used in research to inhibit heart muscle myosin, non-muscle myosin II, and skeletal muscle myosin. Blebbistatin has been especially useful in optical mapping of the heart, and its recent use in cardiac muscle cell cultures has improved cell survival time. However, its adverse characteristics e.g. its cytotoxicity and blue-light instability or low solubility in water often make its application challenging. Recently its applicability was improved by chemical design and its derivatives overcome the limitations of blebbistatin. E.g. para-nitroblebbistatin and para-aminoblebbistatin are photostable, and they are neither cytotoxic nor fluorescent.

== Mode of action and biological effects ==
Blebbistatin inhibits myosin ATPase activity and this way acto-myosin based motility. It binds halfway between the nucleotide binding pocket and the actin binding cleft of myosin, predominantly in an actin detached conformation. This type of inhibition relaxes the acto-myosin myofilaments and leads to several biological effects.

Blebbistatin inhibits the formation of blebs in melanoma cell culture, hence its name. At a cellular level, blebbistatin also inhibits cytokinesis and may also disrupt mitotic spindle formation. Migration of cells can be either enhanced or inhibited depending on other conditions. In neurons, blebbistatin was found to promote neurite outgrowth. At the organ level blebbistatin stops the contraction of skeletal muscle or heart muscle. Blebbistatin has also been found to stabilize the super relaxed state in the myofilaments, where myosin heads are in a helical order and interact with each other but not with actin.

== Adverse characteristics ==
A number of physicochemical deficiencies hamper the use of blebbistatin as a chemical tool in particular applications.

=== Photo-instability ===
Upon blue light illumination, blebbistatin becomes inactive and phototoxic due to changes in the structure of the compound accompanied by the generation of ROS

=== Fluorescence ===
Blebbistatin is a relatively strong fluorophore. When dissolved in water, it absorbs at 420 nm and emits at 490 nm however in DMSO or when perfused through cardiac tissue, it absorbs around 430 nm and emits around 560 nm, therefore at high concentrations its fluorescence interferes with GFP imaging or FRET experiments. Reduction of the concentration of blebbistatin to 6.25 uM allows for FRET imaging in isolated adult mouse cardiac muscle cells.

=== Cytotoxicity ===
Long-term incubation with blebbistatin results in cell damage and cytotoxicity, which are independent of the myosin inhibitory effect.

This photo-instability, phototoxicity and fluorescence makes in-vivo imaging of blebbistatin-treated samples impossible.

== Myosin specificity ==
Blebbistatin is a potent inhibitor of nonmuscle myosin IIA and IIB, cardiac myosin, skeletal myosin and smooth muscle but does not inhibit myosin I, V and X. The table below summarizes IC50 data of blebbistatin on different myosin isoforms.

| species | myosin isoform or muscle type | assay type | IC50 |
|---|---|---|---|
| Dictyostelium discoideum | myosin II motor domain | basal ATPase | 2.96 ± 0.45 μM, 4.4 ± 0.3 μM, 4.9 μM |
| Dictyostelium discoideum | myosin II motor domain | actin activated ATPase | 3.9 ± 0.3 μM |
| Rabbit | skeletal muscle II | basal ATPase | 0.50 μM, 0.3 ± 0.03 μM, 0.41 ± 0.03 μM |
| Rabbit | skeletal muscle II | actin activated ATPase | 0.11 ± 0.009 μM |
| Porcine | b-cardiac muscle | basal ATPase | 1.2 μM |
| Scallop | striated muscle | basal ATPase | 2.3 μM |
| Human | nonmuscle IIA | basal ATPase | 5.1 μM |
| Chicken | nonmuscle IIB | basal ATPase | 1.8 μM |
| Human | nonmuscle IIA | actin activated ATPase | 3.58 μM |
| Human | nonmuscle IIB | actin activated ATPase | 2.30 μM |
| Mouse | nonmuscle IIC | actin activated ATPase | 1.57 μM |
| Turkey | smooth muscle | basal ATPase | 79.6 μM |
| Acanthamoeba | myosin II | basal ATPase | 83 μM |
| Rat | myosin 1B | basal ATPase | >150 μM |
| Acanthamoeba | myosin IC | basal ATPase | >150 μM |
| Mouse | myosin V | basal ATPase | >150 μM |
| Bovine | myosin X | basal ATPase | >150 μM |
| | smooth muscle myosin IIA heavy-chain | actin activated ATPase | 3 μM |
| | smooth muscle myosin IIB heavy-chain | actin activated ATPase | 3 μM |
| Rabbit | femoral, renal and saphenous artery | tonic contraction | 5 μM |
| Chicken | gizzard | contraction | 20 μM |
| Chicken | gizzard smooth muscle HMM | basal ATPase | 15 ± 0.6 μM |
| Chicken | gizzard smooth muscle | actin activated ATPase | 6.47 μM |
| Rat | bladder | contraction | 100% inhibition at 15 μM |
| Mouse | intact paced cardiac papillary muscle | contraction | 1.3 μM |
| Mouse | Ca^{2+}-activated, permeabilized cardiac papillary muscle | contraction | 2.8 μM |
| Rat | skinned cardiac trabeculae | Ca^{2+} activated force | 0.38 ± 0.03 μM |
| Rat | native demembranated right ventricular trabeculae | isometric force development | 3.17 ± 0.43 μM |
| Drosophila | nonmuscle myosin-2 | actin activated ATPase | no inhibition |
| Drosophila | nonmuscle myosin-2 M466I mutation | actin activated ATPase | 36.3 ± 4.1 μM |
| Drosophila | cardiac tubes | heart wall motion | 100 μM resulted in full inhibition |
| Starfish | nonmuscle myosin-2 | oocyte cytokinesis | effective at 300 μM |
| C. elegans | nonmuscle myosin-2 | acto-myosin colocalization microscopy | effective at 100 μM |
| C. elegans | nonmuscle myosin-2 | ventral enclosure | effective at 100 μM |
| Podocoryna carnea (cnidarian) | nonmuscle myosin-2 | stolon tip pulsations and gastrovascular flow | effective at 255 μM |

== Derivatives ==
The main aims of the structure-activity relationship work on the blebbistatin scaffold are the improvement of the physicochemical properties and the ATPase inhibitory potency, for use as chemical or pharmacological tools. Several analogs with superior properties have been developed, and guidelines for their optimal use have been described.

=== para-Nitroblebbistatin ===
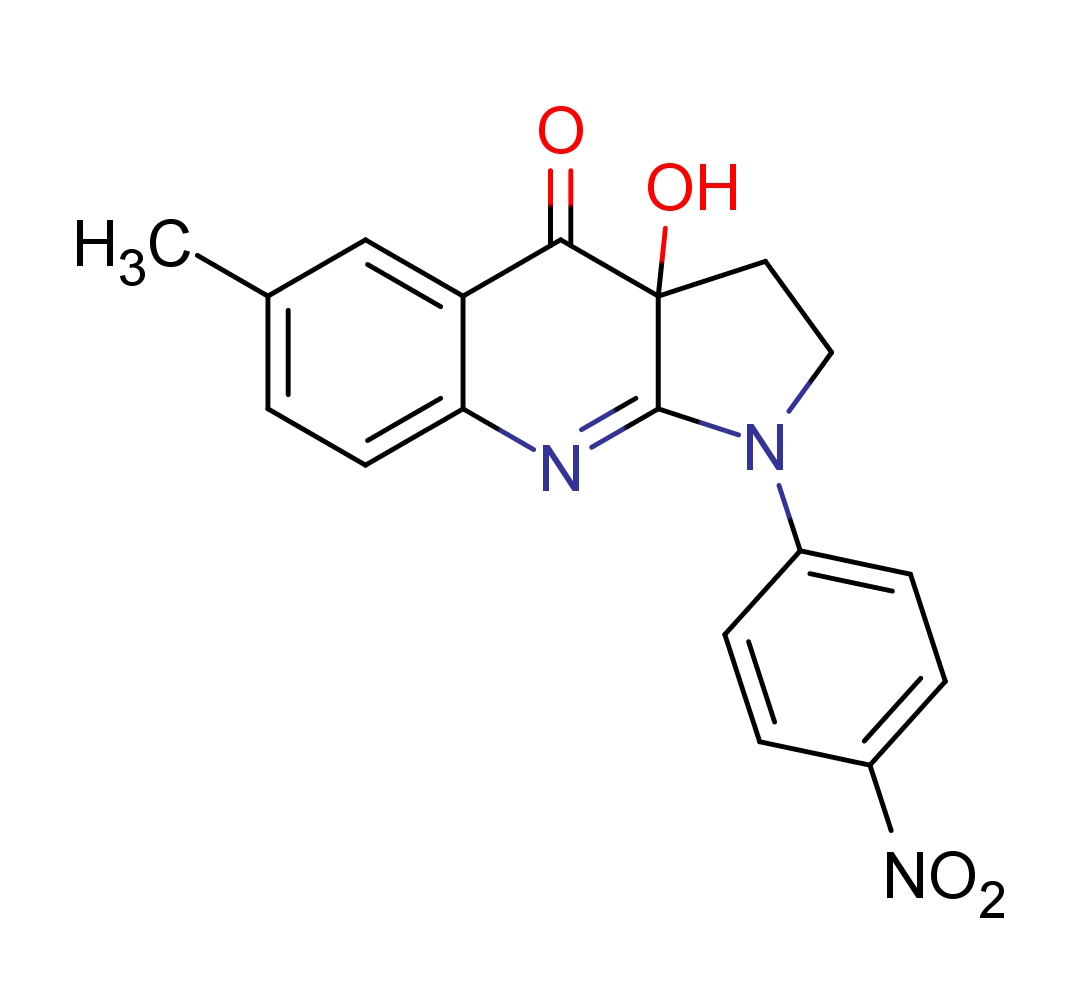
2D structure of para-nitroblebbistatin

A non-fluorescent, non-phototoxic, non-cytotoxic derivative developed in 2014. Its myosin inhibitory properties are similar to those of blebbistatin (for rabbit skeletal muscle myosin S1 IC50=0.4 μM, for Dictyostelium discoideum myosin II motor domain IC50=2.3 μM, for human β-cardiac myosin subfragment 1 IC50=13 μM, for heavy meromyosin fragment of chicken skeletal muscle myosin IC50=0.4 μM). It has been successfully used in fluorescent imaging experiments involving myosin IIA-GFP expressing live dendritic cells

=== para-Aminoblebbistatin ===
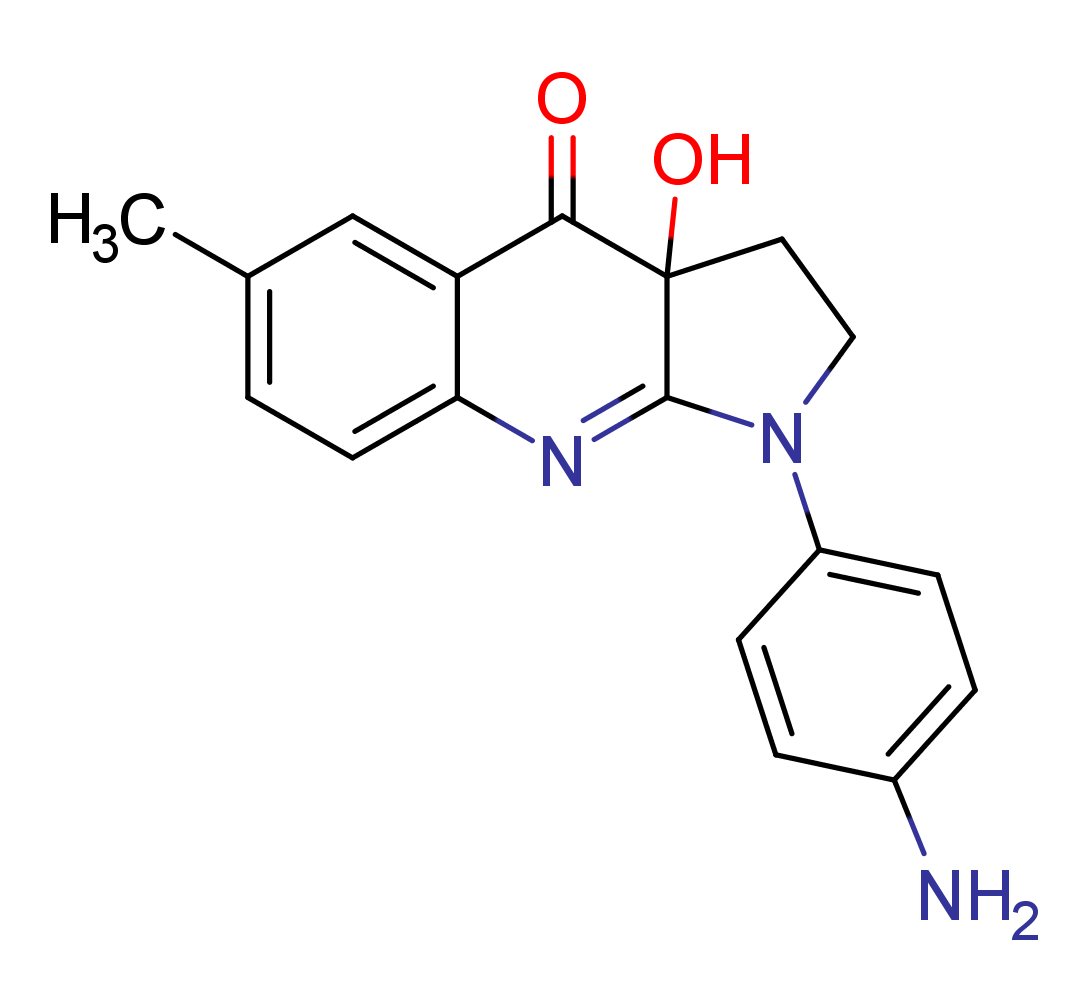
2D structure of para-aminoblebbistatin

A water-soluble blebbistatin derivative developed in 2016, its high water solubility (~400 µM) enables in vivo research applications. Para-aminoblebbistatin is a slightly weaker myosin inhibitor than blebbistatin (for rabbit skeletal muscle myosin S1 IC50=1.3 μM, for Dictyostelium discoideum myosin II motor domain IC50=6.6 μM with only 90% maximal inhibition), it is non-fluorescent, photostable, neither cytotoxic nor phototoxic.

=== Azidoblebbistatin ===
A photoreactive myosin inhibitor developed in 2012. A permanent inhibition of myosin may be achieved by covalently crosslinking the inhibitor azidoblebbistatin to its target by photoaffinity labeling (PAL). Briefly, upon UV illumination, the aryl-azide moiety in azidoblebbistatin forms a reactive nitrene. This reaction is utilized to form covalent link between the inhibitor and myosin.

Azidoblebbistatin is also sensitive to two-photon irradiation, i.e. the covalent crosslink may also be generated by two-photon excitation microscope, therefore azidoblebbistatin is suitable for molecular tattooing.

=== (S)-Nitroblebbistatin ===
This derivative was developed in 2005 to increase the photostability and decrease the fluorescence of blebbistatin. (S)-nitro-blebbistatin is indeed stable to prolonged irradiation at 450-490 nm and has been successfully used in fluorescent live cell imaging. However its affinity to myosin significantly decreased with the nitro-substitution (for nonmuscle myosin IIA, the IC_{50} = 27 μM). In many cases due to the low solubility, it is not possible to achieve full inhibition of myosin with (S)-nitro-blebbistatin. It is effective for FRET imaging of isolated adult mouse cardiac muscle cells.

=== (+)-Blebbistatin ===
(+)-Blebbistatin (or (R)-blebbistatin) is the inactive enantiomer of blebbistatin which inhibits the ATPase activity by maximum 10%. In research, it is useful compound for control treatment, to check the non-myosin related toxic effects of blebbistatin.

=== Other derivatives ===
The blebbistatin scaffold has been modified in several ways to optimize myosin isoform specificity or to improve the inhibitory properties and to map the structure-activity relationship. Major steps in the optimization include the work of Lucas-Lopez et al. from 2008 and the works of Verhasselt et al. from 2017. The latter studies also include modifications of the A- and C-rings of the scaffold.

==== para-Chloroblebbistatin ====
A photostable, non-fluorescent, phototoxic derivative. Its fluorescence is less than 1% of that of blebbistatin myosin inhibitory properties are similar to those of blebbistatin. It is even more phototoxic than blebbistatin.
