= Bleb (cell biology) =

Bulge in the plasma membrane of a cell

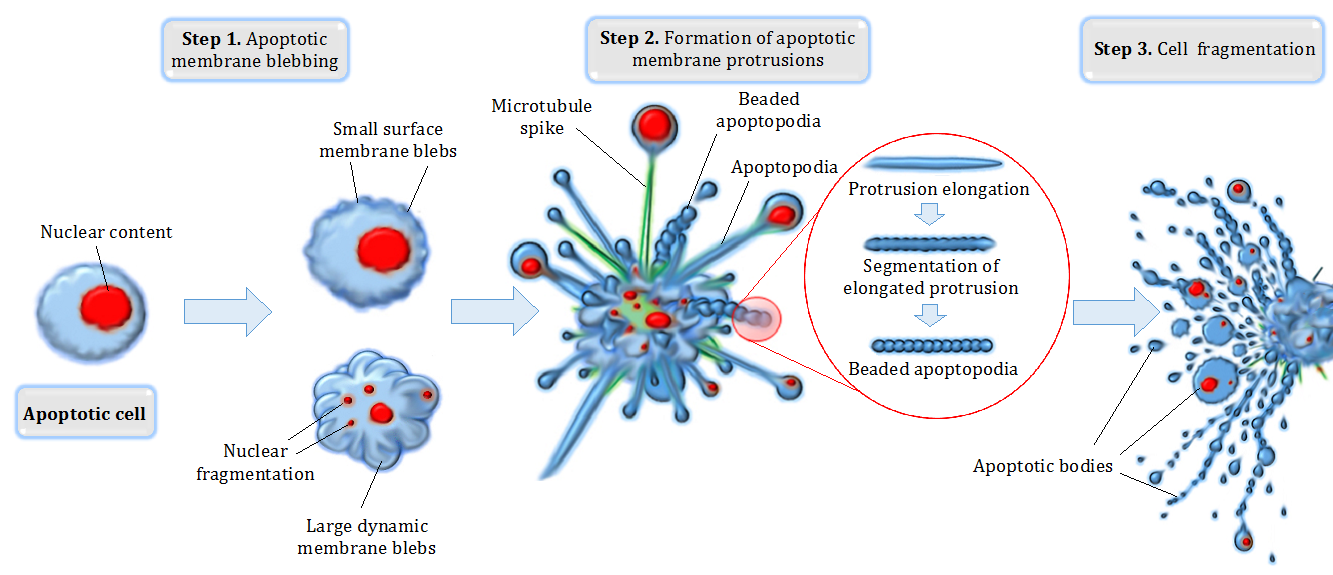
During apoptosis, blebbing is the first phase (left) of cell disassembly.

In cell biology, a bleb (or snout) is a bulge of the plasma membrane of a cell, characterized by a spherical, "blister-like", bulky morphology. It is characterized by the decoupling of the cytoskeleton from the plasma membrane, degrading the internal structure of the cell, allowing the flexibility required for the cell to separate into individual bulges or pockets of the intercellular matrix. Most commonly, blebs are seen in apoptosis (programmed cell death), but they are also seen in other non-apoptotic functions, including apocrine secretion (cell secretion by disintegration of part of a cell). Blebbing, or zeiosis, is the formation of blebs.

== Formation ==
=== Initiation and expansion ===
Bleb growth is driven by intracellular pressure (abnormal growth) generated in the cytoplasm when the actin cortex undergoes actomyosin contractions. The disruption of the membrane-actin cortex interactions are dependent on the activity of myosin-ATPase. Bleb initiation is affected by three main factors: high intracellular pressure, decreased amounts of cortex-membrane linker proteins, and deterioration of the actin cortex. The integrity of the connection between the actin cortex and the membrane are dependent on how intact the cortex is and how many proteins link the two structures. When this integrity is compromised, the addition of pressure is able to make the membrane bulge out from the rest of the cell. The presence of only one or two of these factors is often not enough to drive bleb formation. Bleb formation has also been associated with increases in myosin contractility and local myosin activity increases.

Bleb formation can be initiated in two ways: 1) through local rupture of the cortex or 2) through local detachment of the cortex from the plasma membrane. This generates a weak spot through which the cytoplasm flows, leading to the expansion of the bulge of membrane by increasing the surface area through tearing of the membrane from the cortex, during which time, actin levels decrease. The cytoplasmic flow is driven by hydrostatic pressure inside the cell. Before the bleb is able to expand, pressure must build enough to reach a threshold. This threshold is the amount of pressure needed to overcome the resistance of the plasma membrane to deformation.

=== Artificial induction ===
Bleb formation has been artificially induced in multiple lab cell models using different methods. By inserting a micropipette into a cell, the cell can be aspirated rapidly until destruction of cortex-membrane bonds causes blebbing. Breakage of cortex-membrane bonds has also been caused by laser ablation and injection of an actin depolymerizing drug, which in both cases eventually led to blebbing of the cell membrane. Artificially increased levels of myosin contractility were also shown to induce blebbing in cells. Some viruses, such as the poxvirus Vaccinia, have been shown to induce blebbing in cells as they bind to surface proteins. Although the exact mechanism is not yet fully understood, this process is crucial to endocytosing the virion and subsequent infection.

== Cellular function ==
=== Apoptotic function ===
Blebbing is one of the defined features of apoptosis. During apoptosis (programmed cell death), the cell's cytoskeleton breaks up and causes the membrane to bulge outward. These bulges may separate from the cell, taking a portion of cytoplasm with them, to become known as apoptotic blebs. Phagocytic cells eventually consume these fragments and the components are recycled.

Two types of blebs are recognized in apoptosis. Initially, small surface blebs are formed. During later stages, larger so-called dynamic blebs may appear, which may carry larger organelle fragments such as larger parts of the fragmented apoptotic cell nucleus.

=== Function in cell migration ===
Along with lamellipodia, blebs serve an important role in cell migration. Migrating cells are able to polarize the formation of blebs so blebbing only occurs on the leading edge of the cell. A 2D moving cell is able to use adhesive molecules to gain traction in its environment while blebs form at the leading edge. By forming a bleb, the center of mass of the cell shifts forward and an overall movement of cytoplasm is accomplished. Cells have also been known to accomplish 3D bleb-based movement through a process called chimneying. In this process, cells exert pressure on the top and bottom substrates by squeezing themselves, causing a bleb on the leading edge to grow and the cell to have a net movement forward.

=== Apocrine secretion ===
Apocrine secretion is the mode of secretion of exocrine glands wherein secretory cells accumulate material at their apical ends, and this material then buds off from the cells. In many aspects, it can be seen as apoptosis of part of a cell. The secretion process generally initiates with secretory granules accumulating in an apical bleb (also called "apical snout") of the cell, which subsequently disintegrates to release secretory granules into the lumen.

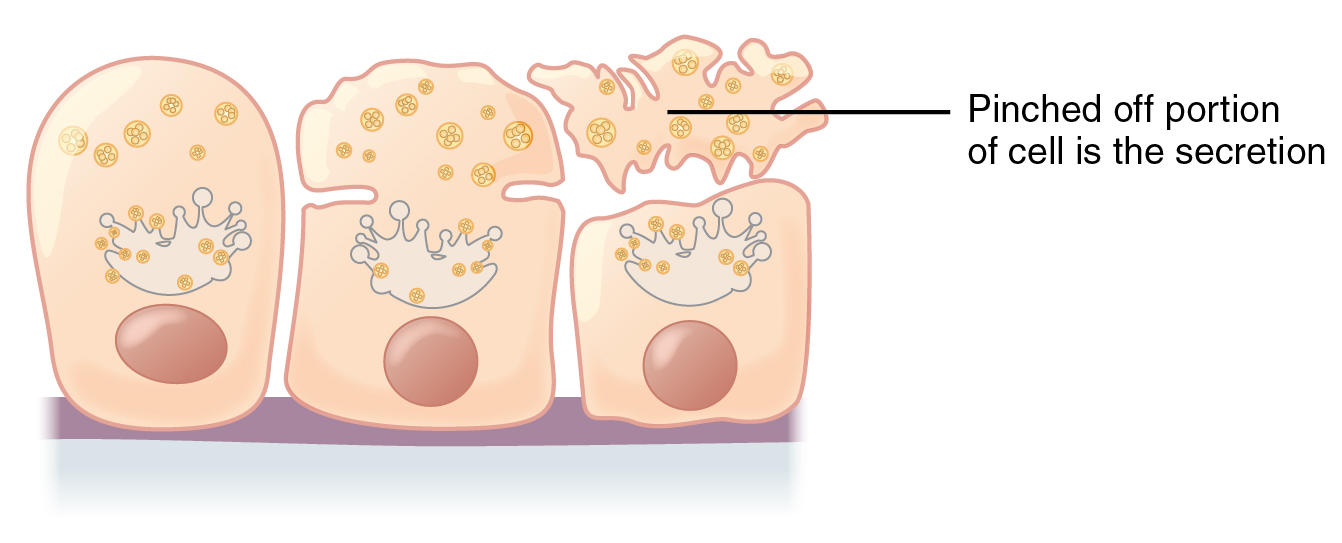
Apocrine secretion

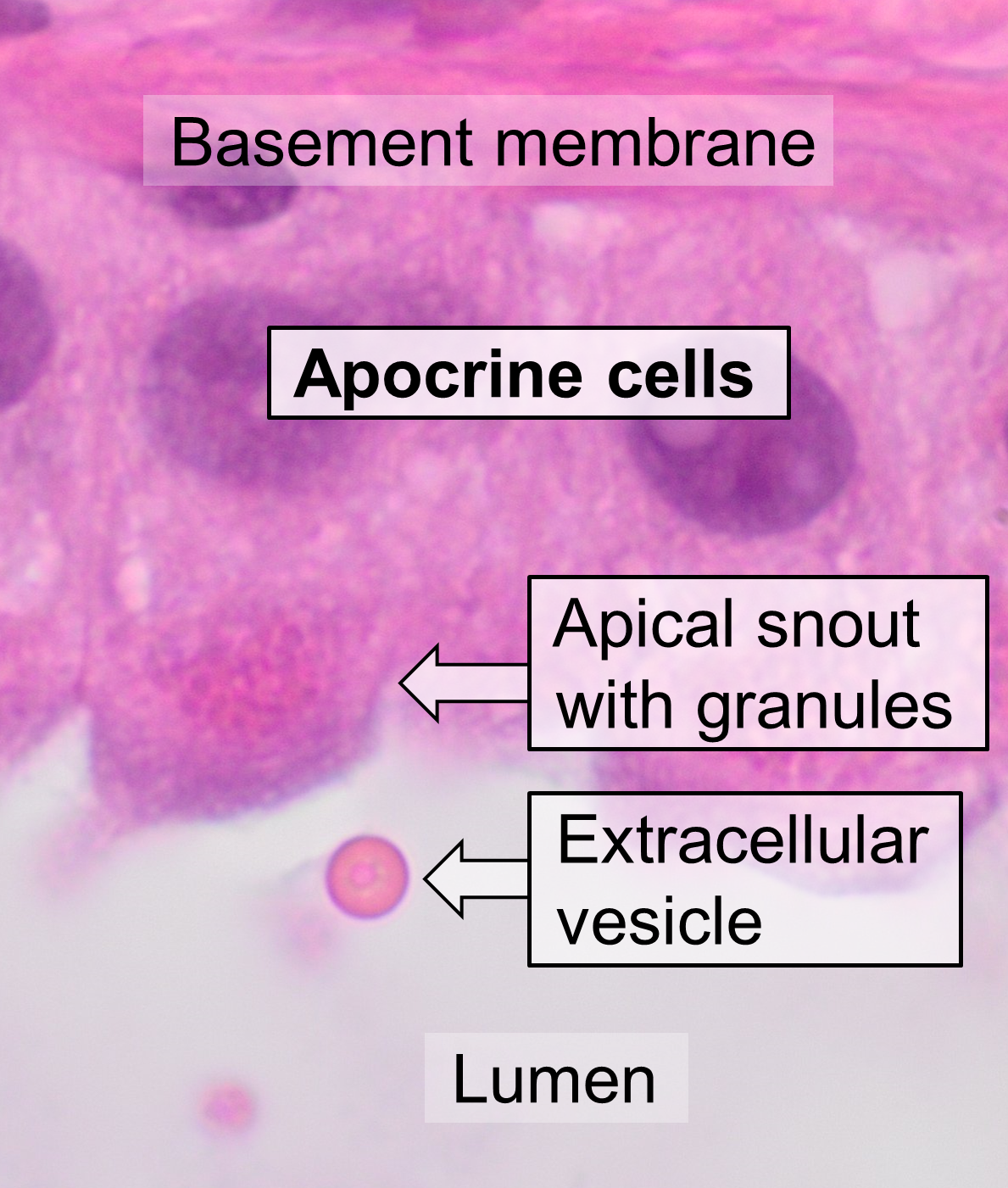
Histology of apocrine cells, H&E stain.

=== Miscellaneous functions ===
Blebbing also has important functions in other cellular processes, including cell locomotion, cell division, and physical or chemical stresses. Blebs have been seen in cultured cells in certain stages of the cell cycle. These blebs are used for cell locomotion in embryogenesis. The types of blebs vary greatly, including variations in bleb growth rates, size, contents, and actin content. It also plays an important role in all five varieties of necrosis, a generally detrimental process. However, cell organelles do not spread into necrotic blebs.

== Inhibition ==
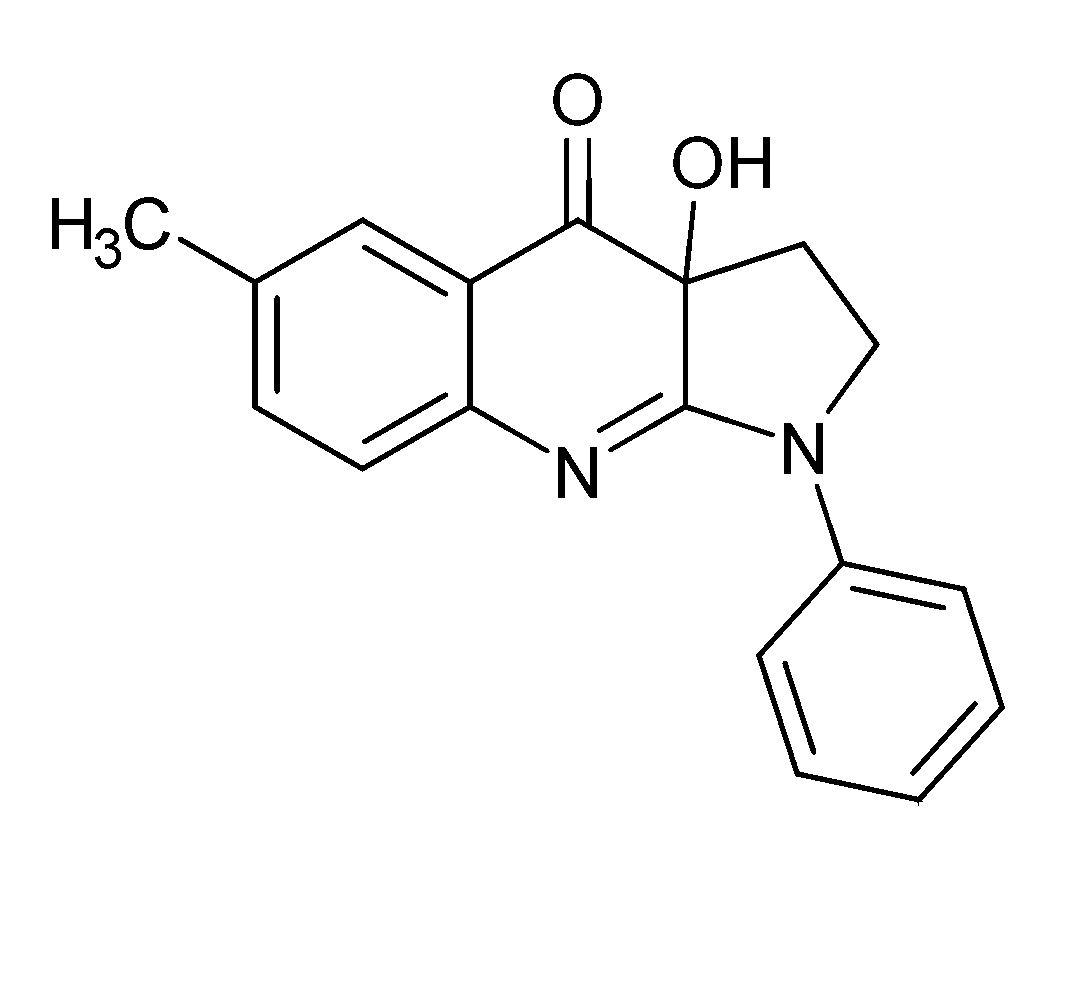
Chemical structure of blebbistatin

In 2004, a chemical known as blebbistatin was shown to inhibit the formation of blebs. This agent was discovered in a screen for small molecule inhibitors of nonmuscle myosin IIA. Blebbistatin allosterically inhibits myosin II by binding near the actin-binding site and ATP-binding site. This interaction stabilizes a form of myosin II that is not bound to actin, thus lowering the affinity of myosin with actin. By interfering with myosin function, blebbistatin alters the contractile forces that impinge on the cytoskeleton-membrane interface and prevents the build up of intracellular pressure needed for blebbing. Blebbistatin has been investigated for its potential medical uses to treat fibrosis, cancer, and nerve injury. However, blebbistatin is known to be cytotoxic, photosensitive, and fluorescent, leading to the development of new derivatives to solve these problems. Some notable derivatives include azidoblebbistatin, para-nitroblebbistatin, and para-aminoblebbistatin.
