= Para-Nitroblebbistatin =

para-Nitroblebbistatin
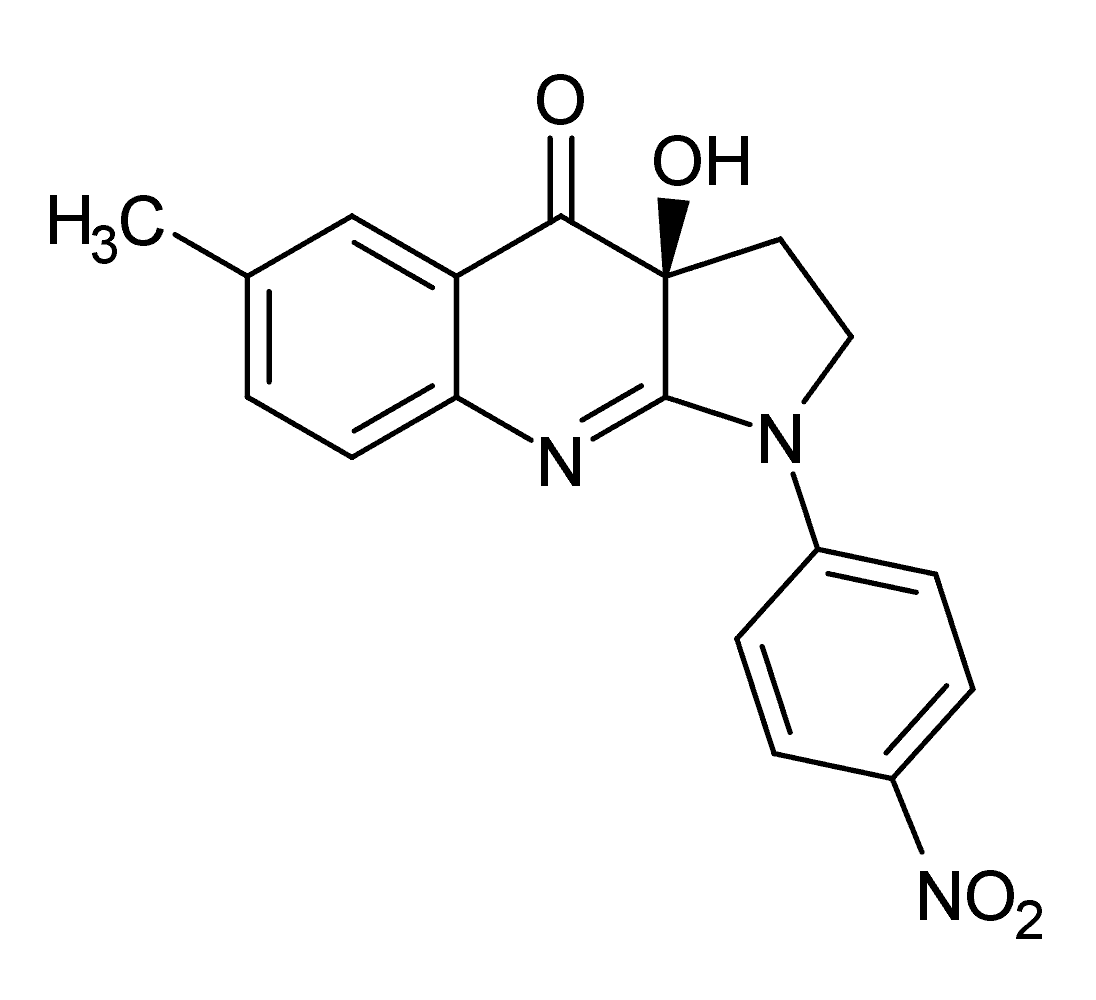

Names
- IUPAC name (3aS)-3a-Hydroxy-6-methyl-1-(4-nitrophenyl)-2,3-dihydropyrrolo[2,3-b]quinolin-4-one
- Other names: p-Nitroblebbistatin; (3aS)-1,2,3,3a-Tetrahydro-3a-hydroxy-6-methyl-1-(4-nitrophenyl)-4H-pyrrolo[2,3-b]quinolin-4-one

Identifiers
CAS Number	1621326-32-6
3D model (JSmol)	Interactive image
ChEMBL	ChEMBL4162111
ChemSpider	68004131
PubChem CID	102361739
- InChI: InChI=1S/C18H15N3O4/c1-11-2-7-15-14(10-11)16(22)18(23)8-9-20(17(18)19-15)12-3-5-13(6-4-12)21(24)25/h2-7,10,23H,8-9H2,1H3/t18-/m1/s1 Key: KAUXNLHXGQGFOS-GOSISDBHSA-N
- SMILES: CC1=CC2=C(C=C1)N=C3C(C2=O)(CCN3C4=CC=C(C=C4)[N+](=O)[O-])O

Properties
Chemical formula	C_{18}H_{15}N_{3}O_{4}
Molar mass	337.335 g·mol^{−1}
Appearance	Yellow solid
Solubility in water	~ 5 μM
- Except where otherwise noted, data are given for materials in their standard state (at 25 °C [77 °F], 100 kPa). Infobox references

para-Nitroblebbistatin is a non-phototoxic, photostable myosin inhibitor with low fluorescence. Its myosin inhibitory properties are very similar to those of blebbistatin.

== Myosin specificity ==
Species	Myosin type	IC_{50}
Rabbit	Skeletal muscle myosin S1	0.4 μM, 0.1 μM
Dictyostelium discoideum	Myosin II motor domain	2.3 μM, 9 μM
Human	β-Cardiac myosin subfragment 1	13 μM
Chicken	Heavy meromyosin fragment of skeletal muscle myosin	0.4 μM
Pig (left ventricle)	cardiac myosin	3.9 μM
Chicken (gizzard)	smooth muscle myosin S1	5.6 μM
Human (expressed in Sf9 cells)	non-muscle myosin 2A / B / C motor domains	18 / 14 / 5 μM

== Applications ==
para-Nitroblebbistatin has been successfully used in fluorescent imaging experiments involving myosin IIA-GFP expressing live dendritic cells and synaptophysin-pHluorin expressing live neurons.
