= Acedianthrone =

Names
- Preferred IUPAC name Aceanthryleno[2,1-a]aceanthrylene-4,12-dione

Identifiers
CAS Number	129-68-0
3D model (JSmol)	Interactive image
ChemSpider	60550
ECHA InfoCard	100.004.511
EC Number	204-960-3
PubChem CID	67214
UNII	ZTD26V6AAY
CompTox Dashboard (EPA)	DTXSID6059605
- InChI: InChI=1S/C30H14O2/c31-29-17-9-3-1-7-15(17)25-23-19(11-5-13-21(23)29)28-26-16-8-2-4-10-18(16)30(32)22-14-6-12-20(24(22)26)27(25)28/h1-14H Key: NUNPDAMQSBMCIG-UHFFFAOYSA-N
- SMILES: C1=CC=C2C(=C1)C3=C4C5=C6C(=CC=C5)C(=O)C7=CC=CC=C7C6=C4C8=C3C(=CC=C8)C2=O

Properties
Chemical formula	C_{30}H_{14}O_{2}
Molar mass	406.440 g·mol^{−1}
Density	1.484 g/cm^{3}
- Except where otherwise noted, data are given for materials in their standard state (at 25 °C [77 °F], 100 kPa). Infobox references

Acedianthrone is an octacyclic relative of anthraquinone that is used as a pigment. It is produced from anthrone by condensation with glyoxal followed by dehydrogenation.
