= Apitegromab =

Medication

Monoclonal antibody
- Type: Whole antibody
- Source: Human
- Target: Promyostatin

Clinical data
- Trade names: Isembyld
- Other names: SRK-015, apitegromab-mstn
- AHFS/Drugs.com: Isembyld
- License data: US DailyMed: Apitegromab
- Routes of administration: Intravenous
- ATC code: M09AX16 (WHO)

Legal status
- Legal status: US: ℞-only

Identifiers
- CAS Number: 2278276-46-1
- UNII: UZ54216N0Y
- KEGG: D11797

Chemical and physical data
- Formula: C_{6412}H_{9866}N_{1710}O_{2026}S_{44}
- Molar mass: 144736.04 g·mol^{−1}

Apitegromab, sold under the brand name Isembyld, is a fully human IgG4 lambda monoclonal antibody used for the treatment of spinal muscular atrophy. It is a recombinant monoclonal antibody targeting proforms of myostatin.

The most common side effects include upper respiratory tract infections, vomiting, cough, other viral infections, headache, gastroenteritis, and pharyngitis (sore throat).

Apitegromab was approved for medical use in the United States in September 2026.

== Medical uses ==
Apitegromab is indicated for the treatment of spinal muscular atrophy in people aged two years of age and older who are currently receiving a survival motor neuron 2-targeted treatment. Spinal muscular atrophy is a rare, progressive neuromuscular disease affecting approximately 1 in 10,000 live births and is among the leading genetic causes of infant mortality. It is caused by a faulty survival motor neuron 1 (SMN1) gene that fails to produce a protein essential for motor neuron survival, leading to progressive muscle weakness and wasting.

== Adverse effects ==
The most common adverse reactions include upper respiratory tract infections, vomiting, cough, other viral infections, headache, gastroenteritis, and pharyngitis (sore throat). An increased risk of fractures, including serious fractures, was observed in people treated with apitegromab. Apitegromab may cause fetal harm and may affect reproductive function.

== History ==
The effectiveness and safety of apitegromab were evaluated in a 52-week randomized, double-blind, placebo-controlled trial (NCT05156320). The trial enrolled 188 participants with spinal muscular atrophy between 2 to 21 years of age who were not able to move or walk independently. All participants were already receiving an approved survival motor neuron 2-targeted treatment. Participants were randomly assigned to receive apitegromab 10 mg/kg, apitegromab 20 mg/kg via intravenous infusion, or placebo once every four weeks for approximately one year. The primary analysis was conducted in 156 participants aged 2 to 12 years of age.

== Society and culture ==
=== Legal status ===
In August 2026, Scholar Rock Netherlands withdrew its application for a marketing authorization of Isembyld for the treatment of 5q spinal muscular atrophy. The company stated that the manufacturing site used to make the medicine had not demonstrated compliance with EU GMP requirements within the required time limit.

Apitegromab was authorized for medical use in the United States in September 2026.

The US Food and Drug Administration (FDA) granted the application for apitegromab fast track, orphan drug, and rare pediatric disease designations. The FDA granted the approval of Isembyld to Scholar Rock.

== Research ==
Apitegromab is under investigation for Facioscapulohumeral Muscular Dystrophy (FSHD) and to reduce lean mass loss during treatment with GLP-1 receptor agonists.

=== Names ===
Apitegromab is the international nonproprietary name.

Apitegromab is sold under the brand name Isembyld.
