= Anthrone =

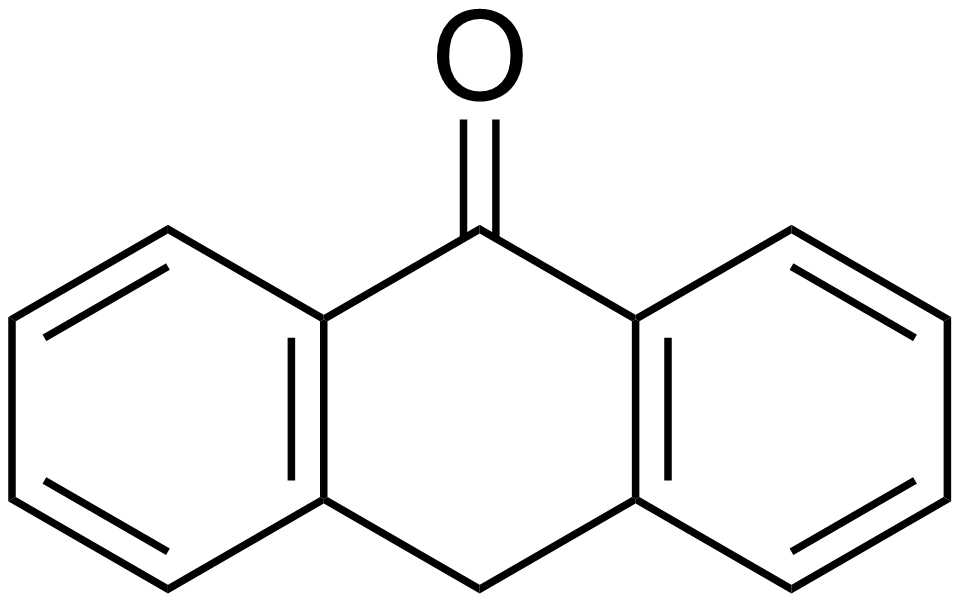
- Skeletal formula

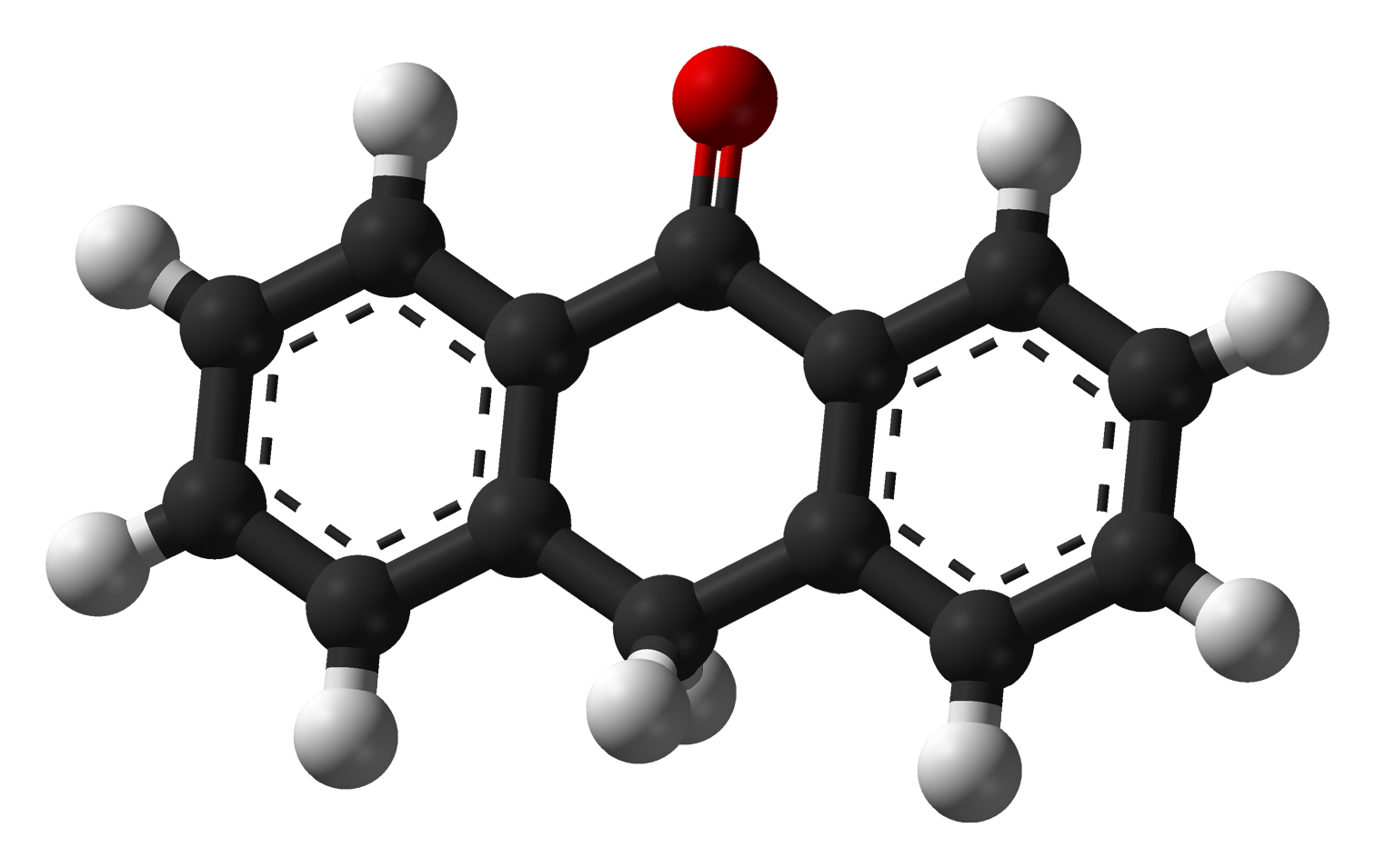
- Ball-and-stick model

Names
- Preferred IUPAC name Anthracen-9(10H)-one
- Other names: Carbothrone; 9-Oxoanthracene

Identifiers
CAS Number	90-44-8
3D model (JSmol)	Interactive image
ChEBI	CHEBI:33835
ChEMBL	ChEMBL124440
ChemSpider	6751
ECHA InfoCard	100.001.813
PubChem CID	7018
UNII	FP0FJ7K744
CompTox Dashboard (EPA)	DTXSID1049431
- InChI: InChI=1S/C14H10O/c15-14-12-7-3-1-5-10(12)9-11-6-2-4-8-13(11)14/h1-8H,9H2 Key: RJGDLRCDCYRQOQ-UHFFFAOYSA-N; InChI=1/C14H10O/c15-14-12-7-3-1-5-10(12)9-11-6-2-4-8-13(11)14/h1-8H,9H2 Key: RJGDLRCDCYRQOQ-UHFFFAOYAA
- SMILES: O=C2c1c(cccc1)Cc3c2cccc3

Properties
Chemical formula	C_{14}H_{10}O
Molar mass	194.233 g·mol^{−1}
Appearance	White to light yellow needles
Melting point	155 to 158 °C (311 to 316 °F; 428 to 431 K)
Solubility in water	Insoluble
- Except where otherwise noted, data are given for materials in their standard state (at 25 °C [77 °F], 100 kPa). verify (what is ?) Infobox references

Anthrone is a tricyclic aromatic ketone. It is used for a common cellulose assay and in the colorimetric determination of carbohydrates.

In strongly acidic media, carbohydrates form furfural derivatives that react with anthrone to produce colored compounds. Anthrone-based reagents are also used as visualization stains in thin-layer chromatography for detecting sugars, particularly ketoses, and glycolipids such as cerebrosides.

Derivatives of anthrone are used in pharmacy as laxative. They stimulate the motion of the colon and reduce water reabsorption. Some anthrone derivatives can be extracted from a variety of plants, including Rhamnus frangula, Aloe ferox, Rheum officinale, and Cassia senna. Glycosides of anthrone are also found in high amounts in rhubarb leaves, and alongside concentrated amounts of oxalic acid are the reason for the leaves being inedible.

== Synthesis and reactions ==
Anthrone can be prepared from anthraquinone by reduction with tin or copper.

An alternative synthesis involves cyclization of o-benzylbenzoic acid induced with hydrogen fluoride.

Anthrone syntheses

Anthrone condenses with glyoxal to give, following dehydrogenation, acedianthrone, a useful octacyclic pigment.

Tautomeric equilibrium for anthrone.

Anthrone is the more commonly encountered tautomer of anthrol, as has been established also by X-ray crystallography. The tautomeric equilibrium constant is estimated at 100 in aqueous solution. For the two other isomeric anthrols, the tautomeric equilibrium is reversed: they are phenolic.

Anthrone undergoes nitration using conventional conditions for aromatic nitration, implying that it is the hydroxy tautomer that is the reactant.
