= Ansoxetine =

Chemical compound

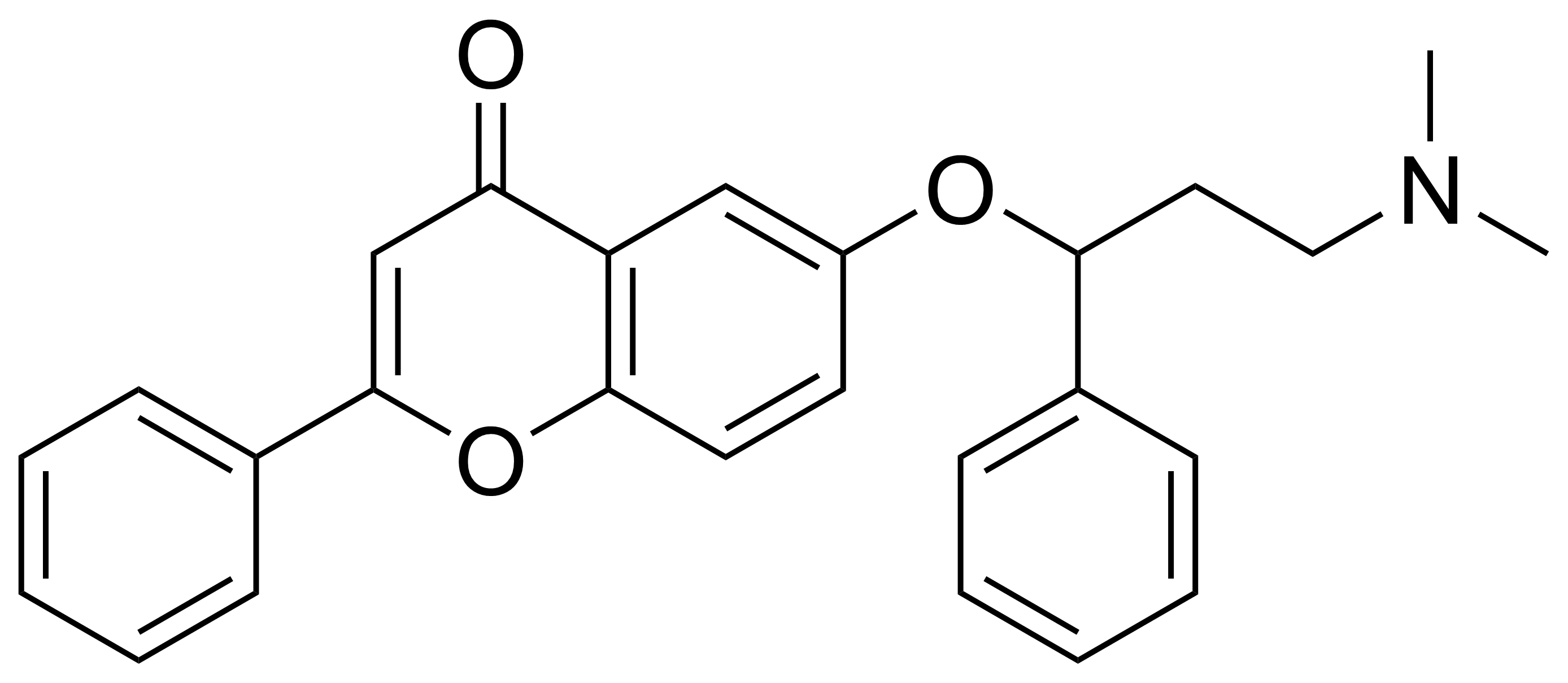

Clinical data
- ATC code: None

Identifiers
- IUPAC name: 6-[3-(dimethylamino)-1-phenylpropoxy]-2-phenyl-4H-chromen-4-one
- CAS Number: 79130-64-6
- PubChem CID: 179333
- ChemSpider: 156100
- UNII: 3LY71185IQ
- ChEMBL: ChEMBL2104191
- CompTox Dashboard (EPA): DTXSID00868501

Chemical and physical data
- Formula: C_{26}H_{25}NO_{3}
- Molar mass: 399.490 g·mol^{−1}
- 3D model (JSmol): Interactive image
- SMILES: O=C\1c4c(O/C(=C/1)c2ccccc2)ccc(OC(c3ccccc3)CCN(C)C)c4
- InChI: InChI=1S/C26H25NO3/c1-27(2)16-15-24(19-9-5-3-6-10-19)29-21-13-14-25-22(17-21)23(28)18-26(30-25)20-11-7-4-8-12-20/h3-14,17-18,24H,15-16H2,1-2H3; Key:JDQWJVUVMKPZLU-UHFFFAOYSA-N

Ansoxetine is the trade name of a type of antidepressant medication. It was never marketed.
