= Apoptozole =

Drug

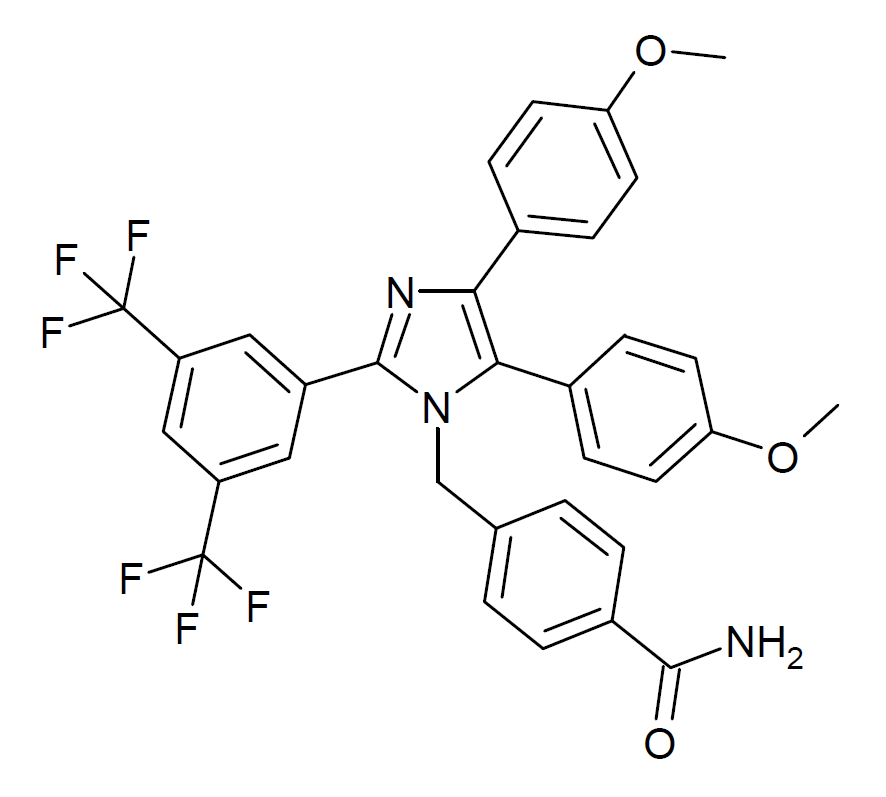

Clinical data
- Trade names: Apoptozole

Identifiers
- IUPAC name: 4-[[2-[3,5-bis(trifluoromethyl)phenyl]-4,5-bis(4-methoxyphenyl)imidazol-1-yl]methyl]benzamide
- CAS Number: 1054543-47-3
- PubChem CID: 24894064
- ChemSpider: 29340758
- UNII: WD0EH16QCD
- ChEMBL: ChEMBL3416503
- CompTox Dashboard (EPA): DTXSID201027756

Chemical and physical data
- Formula: C_{33}H_{25}F_{6}N_{3}O_{3}
- Molar mass: 625.571 g·mol^{−1}
- 3D model (JSmol): Interactive image
- SMILES: COC1=CC=C(C=C1)C2=C(N(C(=N2)C3=CC(=CC(=C3)C(F)(F)F)C(F)(F)F)CC4=CC=C(C=C4)C(=O)N)C5=CC=C(C=C5)OC
- InChI: InChI=1S/C33H25F6N3O3/c1-44-26-11-7-20(8-12-26)28-29(21-9-13-27(45-2)14-10-21)42(18-19-3-5-22(6-4-19)30(40)43)31(41-28)23-15-24(32(34,35)36)17-25(16-23)33(37,38)39/h3-17H,18H2,1-2H3,(H2,40,43); Key:ZIMMTPFXOMAJTQ-UHFFFAOYSA-N

Apoptozole is a drug that acts as a potent and selective inhibitor of the heat shock protein Hsp70, and was one of the first compounds developed to act at this target. It induces apoptosis in susceptible cells, and displays anti-cancer, anti-malarial and antiviral activity. The promising results in animal studies makes it likely that either apoptozole or compounds with similar modes of action will be further researched as potential therapeutics in the future.
