= Para-Aminoblebbistatin =

para-Aminoblebbistatin
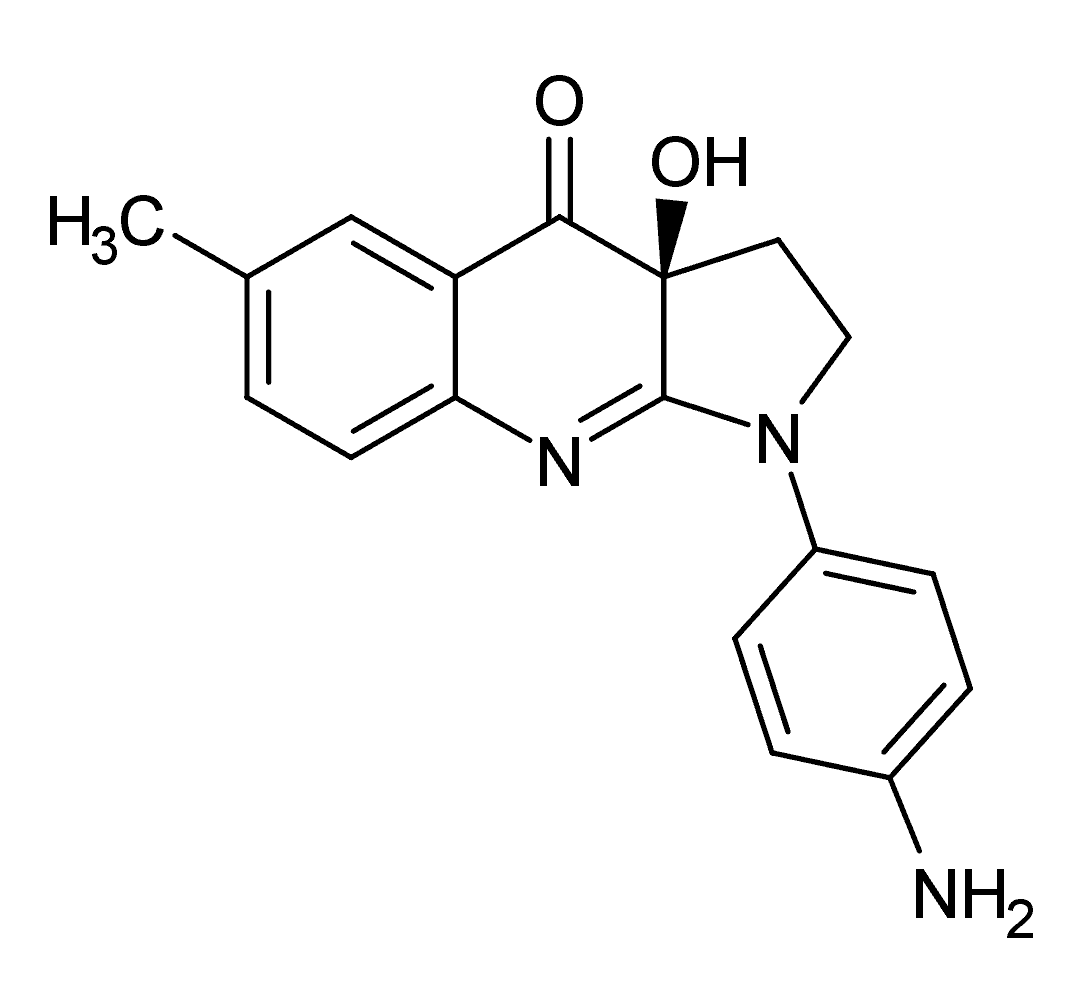

Names
- IUPAC name (3aS)-3a-Hydroxy-6-methyl-1-(4-aminophenyl)-2,3-dihydropyrrolo[2,3-b]quinolin-4-one
- Other names: p-Aminoblebbistatin; p-Aminoblebb; (S)-4'-Aminoblebbistatin; pAB; Optopharma1

Identifiers
CAS Number	2097734-03-5
3D model (JSmol)	Interactive image
ChEMBL	ChEMBL4164044
ChemSpider	81407800
PubChem CID	129626534
CompTox Dashboard (EPA)	DTXSID101336358
- InChI: InChI=1S/C18H17N3O2/c1-11-2-7-15-14(10-11)16(22)18(23)8-9-21(17(18)20-15)13-5-3-12(19)4-6-13/h2-7,10,23H,8-9,19H2,1H3/t18-/m1/s1 Key: LYWLZINJPRNWFF-GOSISDBHSA-N
- SMILES: CC1=CC2=C(C=C1)N=C3C(C2=O)(CCN3C4=CC=C(C=C4)N)O

Properties
Chemical formula	C_{18}H_{17}N_{3}O_{2}
Molar mass	307.353 g·mol^{−1}
Appearance	Yellow solid
Solubility in water	~ 400 μM
- Except where otherwise noted, data are given for materials in their standard state (at 25 °C [77 °F], 100 kPa). Infobox references

para-Aminoblebbistatin is a water-soluble, non-fluorescent, photostable myosin II inhibitor, developed from blebbistatin. Among the several blebbistatin derivatives it is one of the most promising for research applications. Furthermore, it has a favourable overall profile considering inhibitory properties and ADME calculations.

== Myosin specificity ==
Species	Myosin type	IC_{50}
Rabbit	Skeletal muscle myosin S1	1.3 μM, 9.22 μM, 0.98 μM
Dictyostelium discoideum	Myosin II motor domain	6.6 μM, 8.5 μM
Human	slow-twitch skeletal muscle fibre (force)	10 μM
Pig (left ventricle)	cardiac myosin	5.3 μM
Chicken (gizzard)	smooth muscle myosin S1	13 μM
Human (expressed in Sf9 cells)	non-muscle myosin 2A / B / C motor domains	9 / 20 / 7.2 μM
Drosophila melanogaster	bodywall muscle fiber	8.5 μM
