= 2-Phenylbenzofuran =

Chemical compound

Names
- Preferred IUPAC name 2-Phenyl-1-benzofuran

Identifiers
CAS Number	1839-72-1
3D model (JSmol)	Interactive image
ChEMBL	ChEMBL1643182
ChemSpider	2757343
EC Number	654-035-7
PubChem CID	3517936
CompTox Dashboard (EPA)	DTXSID60393243
- InChI: InChI=1S/C14H10O/c1-2-6-11(7-3-1)14-10-12-8-4-5-9-13(12)15-14/h1-10H Key: HXMZLDUBSSPQIB-UHFFFAOYSA-N
- SMILES: C1=CC=C(C=C1)C2=CC3=CC=CC=C3O2

Properties
Chemical formula	C_{14}H_{10}O
Molar mass	194.233 g·mol^{−1}

Hazards
- GHS labelling
Pictograms	(GHS07: Exclamation mark)
Signal word	Warning
Hazard statements	H302, H413
Precautionary statements	P264, P270, P273, P301+P317, P330, P501
- Except where otherwise noted, data are given for materials in their standard state (at 25 °C [77 °F], 100 kPa). Infobox references

2-Phenylbenzofuran (2-phenyl-benzo[b]furan) is a chemical compound that has the molecular formula C_{14}H_{10}O. It is a substituted benzofuran, with a phenyl group as the substituent.

== Occurrence and synthesis ==
2-Phenylbenzofuran is a natural product, and its derivatives (known as 2-phenylbenzofurans) have been isolated from various plants, such as Artocarpus pithecogallus, legumes, and mulberries.

2-Phenylbenzofuran can be synthesized via by the palladium(II)-catalyzed reaction of 2-hydroxybenzyl cyanide and phenylboronic acid in the presence of 2,2'-bipyridine and TFA.

Because there is a substituent at position 2, this benzofuran compound cannot be synthesized by the Perkin rearrangement from a coumarin. However, an alternate sequence has been demonstrated: treatment of 3-phenylcoumarin with aluminium hydride followed by DDQ:

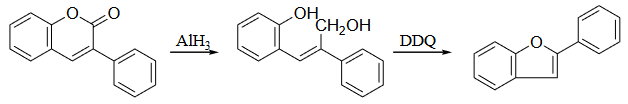

== Applications ==
2-Phenylbenzofuran and its derivatives have been the subject of research on antioxidant drugs, butyrylcholinesterase inhibition, and leishmaniasis treatment.
