= Anrukinzumab =

Chemical compound

Monoclonal antibody
- Type: Whole antibody
- Source: Humanized (from mouse)
- Target: IL13

Clinical data
- ATC code: none

Identifiers
- CAS Number: 910649-32-0
- ChemSpider: none
- UNII: OU46IGC49F

Chemical and physical data
- Formula: C_{6452}H_{9954}N_{1714}O_{2024}S_{46}
- Molar mass: 145393.34 g·mol^{−1}

Anrukinzumab (IMA-638) is a humanized monoclonal antibody designed for the treatment of asthma. It targets IL-13.

Anrukinzumab was developed by Wyeth.
