= Anidoxime =

Experimental painkilling drug

Clinical data
- Other names: Bamoxine, BRL 11870, E 142, USV-E 142.

Identifiers
- IUPAC name: 3-(Diethylamino)-1-phenyl-1-propanone O-(4-methoxyphenyl)aminocarbonyloxime
- CAS Number: 34297-34-2 23654-53-7
- PubChem CID: 35884
- ChemSpider: 4514617
- UNII: 88ETS2Q7LZ
- CompTox Dashboard (EPA): DTXSID40865711

Chemical and physical data
- Formula: C_{21}H_{27}N_{3}O_{3}
- Molar mass: 369.465 g·mol^{−1}
- 3D model (JSmol): Interactive image
- SMILES: CCN(CC)CCC(=NOC(=O)NC1=CC=C(C=C1)OC)C2=CC=CC=C2
- InChI: InChI=1S/C21H27N3O3/c1-4-24(5-2)16-15-20(17-9-7-6-8-10-17)23-27-21(25)22-18-11-13-19(26-3)14-12-18/h6-14H,4-5,15-16H2,1-3H3,(H,22,25); Key:XPHBRTNHVJSEQD-UHFFFAOYSA-N

Anidoxime was an experimental drug that had been evaluated for use as an oral analgesic.

The name is an eponym of an anisdine group and an oxime. The analgesic properties are reportedly equipotent to or greater than morphine but the physical dependence liability may be less.

In rats, the major metabolic pathway is hydrolysis of the carbamoyl group followed by decarboxylation.
