= Anaritide =

Synthetic peptide

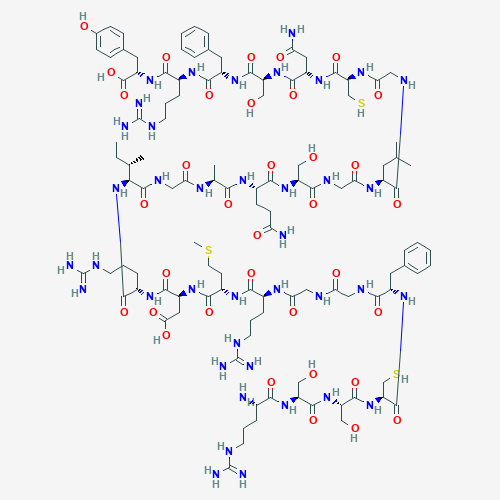
- Tertiary structure of Anaritide

Identifiers
- IUPAC name: L-arginyl-L-seryl-L-seryl-L-cysteinyl-L-phenylalanyl-glycyl-glycyl-L-arginyl-L-methionyl-L-alpha-aspartyl-L-arginyl-L-isoleucyl-glycyl-L-alanyl-L-glutaminyl-L-seryl-glycyl-L-leucyl-glycyl-L-cysteinyl-L-asparagyl-L-seryl-L-phenylalanyl-L-arginyl-L-tyrosine
- CAS Number: 95896-08-5
- PubChem CID: 16132382
- ChemSpider: 17294213
- UNII: 1M00R25BPL

Chemical and physical data
- Formula: C_{112}H_{177}N_{39}O_{35}S_{3}
- Molar mass: 2726.07 g·mol^{−1}
- 3D model (JSmol): Interactive image
- SMILES: CCC(C)C(C(=O)NCC(=O)NC(C)C(=O)NC(CCC(=O)N)C(=O)NC(CO)C(=O)NCC(=O)NC(CC(C)C)C(=O)NCC(=O)NC(CS)C(=O)NC(CC(=O)N)C(=O)NC(CO)C(=O)NC(CC1=CC=CC=C1)C(=O)NC(CCCNC(=N)N)C(=O)NC(CC2=CC=C(C=C2)O)C(=O)O)NC(=O)C(CCCNC(=N)N)NC(=O)C(CC(=O)O)NC(=O)C(CCSC)NC(=O)C(CCCNC(=N)N)NC(=O)CNC(=O)CNC(=O)C(CC3=CC=CC=C3)NC(=O)C(CS)NC(=O)C(CO)NC(=O)C(CO)NC(=O)C(CCCNC(=N)N)N
- InChI: InChI=1S/C112H177N39O35S3/c1-7-56(4)88(151-98(175)65(25-17-36-127-112(122)123)139-101(178)72(43-87(164)165)144-97(174)67(32-37-189-6)140-94(171)63(23-15-34-125-110(118)119)134-84(161)45-128-82(159)44-129-92(169)69(39-58-18-10-8-11-19-58)141-106(183)79(54-188)150-104(181)77(52-155)149-103(180)75(50-153)146-90(167)62(113)22-14-33-124-109(116)117)107(184)132-46-83(160)133-57(5)89(166)137-66(30-31-80(114)157)96(173)147-74(49-152)93(170)131-47-85(162)135-68(38-55(2)3)91(168)130-48-86(163)136-78(53-187)105(182)143-71(42-81(115)158)100(177)148-76(51-154)102(179)142-70(40-59-20-12-9-13-21-59)99(176)138-64(24-16-35-126-111(120)121)95(172)145-73(108(185)186)41-60-26-28-61(156)29-27-60/h8-13,18-21,26-29,55-57,62-79,88,152-156,187-188H,7,14-17,22-25,30-54,113H2,1-6H3,(H2,114,157)(H2,115,158)(H,128,159)(H,129,169)(H,130,168)(H,131,170)(H,132,184)(H,133,160)(H,134,161)(H,135,162)(H,136,163)(H,137,166)(H,138,176)(H,139,178)(H,140,171)(H,141,183)(H,142,179)(H,143,182)(H,144,174)(H,145,172)(H,146,167)(H,147,173)(H,148,177)(H,149,180)(H,150,181)(H,151,175)(H,164,165)(H,185,186)(H4,116,117,124)(H4,118,119,125)(H4,120,121,126)(H4,122,123,127)/t56-,57-,62-,63-,64-,65-,66-,67-,68-,69-,70-,71-,72-,73-,74-,75-,76-,77-,78-,79-,88-/m0/s1; Key:PBSXKCQOTWYLMQ-LWECRCKRSA-N

Anaritide (also known as human atrial natriuretic peptide [102-126]) is a synthetic analogue of atrial natriuretic peptide (ANP).

== Structure ==
Anartidine has the following primary structure:

RSSCFGGRMDRIGAQSGLGCNSFRY

or

H-Arg-Ser-Ser-Cys-Phe-Gly-Gly-Arg-Met-Asp-Arg-Ile-Gly-Ala-Gln-Ser-Gly-Leu-Gly-Cys-Asn-Ser-Phe-Arg-Tyr-OH

This structure is identical to residues 102-126 of human preproANP. In comparison, active human ANP comprises resides 99-126 of human preproANP.

== Medical uses ==
Anaritide has been investigated as a potential therapy for acute tubular necrosis but was shown not to improve the dialysis-free survival of these patients. It also appears to exacerbate proteinuria and natriuresis in patients with nephrotic syndrome.
