= Anipamil =

- Skeletal formula of Anipamil

Names
- IUPAC name 2-(3-methoxyphenyl)-2-[3-[2-(3-methoxyphenyl)ethyl-methylamino]propyl]tetradecanenitrile

Identifiers
CAS Number	83200-10-6
3D model (JSmol)	Interactive image; Interactive image
ChEMBL	ChEMBL2104548
ChemSpider	49636
ECHA InfoCard	100.072.899
EC Number	280-213-5
MeSH	Anipamil
PubChem CID	54966
UNII	9Y54WZV1CJ
CompTox Dashboard (EPA)	DTXSID70868699
- InChI: InChI=1S/C34H52N2O2/c1-5-6-7-8-9-10-11-12-13-14-23-34(29-35,31-19-16-21-33(28-31)38-4)24-17-25-36(2)26-22-30-18-15-20-32(27-30)37-3/h15-16,18-21,27-28H,5-14,17,22-26H2,1-4H3 Key: PHFDAOXXIZOUIX-UHFFFAOYSA-N; InChI=1/C34H52N2O2/c1-5-6-7-8-9-10-11-12-13-14-23-34(29-35,31-19-16-21-33(28-31)38-4)24-17-25-36(2)26-22-30-18-15-20-32(27-30)37-3/h15-16,18-21,27-28H,5-14,17,22-26H2,1-4H3 Key: PHFDAOXXIZOUIX-UHFFFAOYAP
- SMILES: CCCCCCCCCCCCC(CCCN(C)CCC1=CC(OC)=CC=C1)(C#N)C1=CC(OC)=CC=C1; N#CC(c1cc(OC)ccc1)(CCCCCCCCCCCC)CCCN(CCc2cccc(OC)c2)C

Properties
Chemical formula	C_{34}H_{52}N_{2}O_{2}
Molar mass	520.802 g·mol^{−1}
- Except where otherwise noted, data are given for materials in their standard state (at 25 °C [77 °F], 100 kPa). verify (what is ?) Infobox references

Anipamil is a calcium channel blocker, specifically of the phenylalkylamine type. This type is separate from its more common cousin Dihydropyridine. Anipamil is an analog of the more common drug verapamil, which is the most common type of phenylalkylamine style calcium channel blocker. Anipamil has been shown to be a more effective antiarrhythmic medication than verapamil because it does not cause hypertension as seen in verapamil. It is able to do this by bonding to the myocardium tighter than verapamil.

== Study of Effects in Rabbits ==
Anipamil is used to prevent the thickening of aortic muscles in rabbits with hypertension . A study was done by the American Journal of Hypertension to understand the effects anipamil may have on the smooth muscle cell in hypertensive rabbits. After using monoclonal antimyosin antibodies to recognize smooth muscle, nonmuscle myosin heavy chains and identify various aortic smooth muscle types, twenty four rabbits with hypertension were studied over a period of 2.5-4 months. The rabbits were split into two groups of 12, and six rabbits from each group received a 40 mg oral dose of anipamil daily while the remaining received an oral placebo daily. Cryosections of primary and secondary smooth aortic muscle were then taken for morphometry and immunocytochemical studies to understand the potential change in phenotype after the addition of anipamil. The study revealed that smooth aortic muscle treated with anipamil demonstrates less thickening of the muscle and an increase in differentiated cell phenotype . The results of this study showed anipamil has a direct effect on smooth muscle cell phenotypes .

Another study occurred at the Institute of Pharmacological Sciences at the University of Milan to understand the antiatherosclerotic effects of anipamil in Cholesterol-Fed Rabbits. In this study, there were three groups of 18 rabbits: control group, cholesterol-fed group, and a cholesterol-fed group receiving the drug. The control group received a standard pelleted show of 120 grams daily. The cholesterol-fed group received 1.6 grams of cholesterol per day. The cholesterol-red group receiving the drug received 1.6 grams of cholesterol per day along with an anipamil dose of 10 milligrams per day. During the two week, four week, and eight week mark, the amount of plasma cholesterol, triglycerides, and high density lipoprotein cholesterol were measured. The results showed that HDL cholesterol increased at 2-fold and plasma cholesterol increased at a 25-fold. Anipamil had no effect on the plasma cholesterol levels or HDL cholesterol and a decrease in the amount of aortic surface covered by plaque in the cholesterol-fed groups. The study showed that the consumption of anipamil at 10 milligrams per kilogram reduced the amount of plaque covering aortic surface and the amount of cholesterol in the aorta in cholesterol-fed rabbits. This study also showed that the antiatherosclerotic effects of anipamil has no effect on plasma cholesterol levels.
