= Ancarolol =

Chemical compound

Clinical data
- ATC code: none

Identifiers
- IUPAC name: N-[2-[3-(tert-Butylamino)-2-hydroxy-propoxy]phenyl]furan-2-carboxamide
- CAS Number: 75748-50-4
- PubChem CID: 170339
- ChemSpider: 148938
- UNII: 00EED65INL
- ChEMBL: ChEMBL1742449
- CompTox Dashboard (EPA): DTXSID50868379

Chemical and physical data
- Formula: C_{18}H_{24}N_{2}O_{4}
- Molar mass: 332.400 g·mol^{−1}
- 3D model (JSmol): Interactive image
- SMILES: O=C(Nc1ccccc1OCC(O)CNC(C)(C)C)c2occc2
- InChI: InChI=1S/C18H24N2O4/c1-18(2,3)19-11-13(21)12-24-15-8-5-4-7-14(15)20-17(22)16-9-6-10-23-16/h4-10,13,19,21H,11-12H2,1-3H3,(H,20,22); Key:XBRNQRFNEAHCPR-UHFFFAOYSA-N

Ancarolol is a beta blocker.
