= Anthrol =

Identifiers
CAS Number	1-: 610-50-4; 2-: 613-14-9; 9-: 529-86-2; 1,2-: 577-95-7; 1,2,3-: 109439-88-5
3D model (JSmol)	1-: Interactive image; 2-: Interactive image; 9-: Interactive image; 1,2-: Interactive image; 1,2,3-: Interactive image
Beilstein Reference	1869102
ChEBI	1-: CHEBI:37090; 2-: CHEBI:37091; 9-: CHEBI:40753; 1,2-: CHEBI:80376
ChEMBL	1-: ChEMBL3277318
ChemSpider	1-: 109698; 2-: 89896; 9-: 10278; 1,2-: 136955
EC Number	1-: 275-152-6
Gmelin Reference	185412
KEGG	1,2-: C16204
PubChem CID	1-: 123077; 2-: 99503; 9-: 10731; 1,2-: 155464; 1,2,3-: 22491594
UNII	1-: 6W78ZMQ2ZT; 2-: A1C592Z5Y5; 9-: 15PF96Z0OC
- InChI: 1-: InChI=1S/C14H10O/c15-14-7-3-6-12-8-10-4-1-2-5-11(10)9-13(12)14/h1-9,15H Key: MUVQKFGNPGZBII-UHFFFAOYSA-N; 2-: InChI=1S/C14H10O/c15-14-6-5-12-7-10-3-1-2-4-11(10)8-13(12)9-14/h1-9,15H Key: BQBWUVWMUXGILF-UHFFFAOYSA-N; 9-: InChI=1S/C14H10O/c15-14-12-7-3-1-5-10(12)9-11-6-2-4-8-13(11)14/h1-9,15H Key: AUKRYONWZHRJRE-UHFFFAOYSA-N; 1,2-: InChI=1S/C14H10O2/c15-13-6-5-11-7-9-3-1-2-4-10(9)8-12(11)14(13)16/h1-8,15-16H Key: UTCOUOISVRSLSH-UHFFFAOYSA-N; 1,2,3-: InChI=1S/C14H10O3/c15-12-7-10-5-8-3-1-2-4-9(8)6-11(10)13(16)14(12)17/h1-7,15-17H Key: SLOLMTWBBAFOKJ-UHFFFAOYSA-N
- SMILES: 1-: C1=CC=C2C=C3C(=CC2=C1)C=CC=C3O; 2-: C1=CC=C2C=C3C=C(C=CC3=CC2=C1)O; 9-: C1=CC=C2C(=C1)C=C3C=CC=CC3=C2O; 1,2-: C1=CC=C2C=C3C(=CC2=C1)C=CC(=C3O)O; 1,2,3-: C1=CC=C2C=C3C(=CC2=C1)C=C(C(=C3O)O)O
- Except where otherwise noted, data are given for materials in their standard state (at 25 °C [77 °F], 100 kPa). Infobox references

Anthrols (sometimes called anthranols) are the hydroxylated derivatives of anthracene. For the monohydroxo derivatives, three isomers are possible: 1-anthrol, 2-anthrol, and 9-anthrol. The latter exists as a minor tautomer of 9-anthrone.

Monohydroxo isomers
Name	CAS	Melting point		Structure
1-anthrol, 1-hydroxyanthracene	610-50-4	150 °C	302 °F	
2-anthrol, 2-hydroxyanthracene	613-14-9	166 °C	331 °F	
9-anthrol, 9-hydroxyanthracene	529-86-2	152 °C	306 °F	
