= Anitrazafen =

Chemical compound

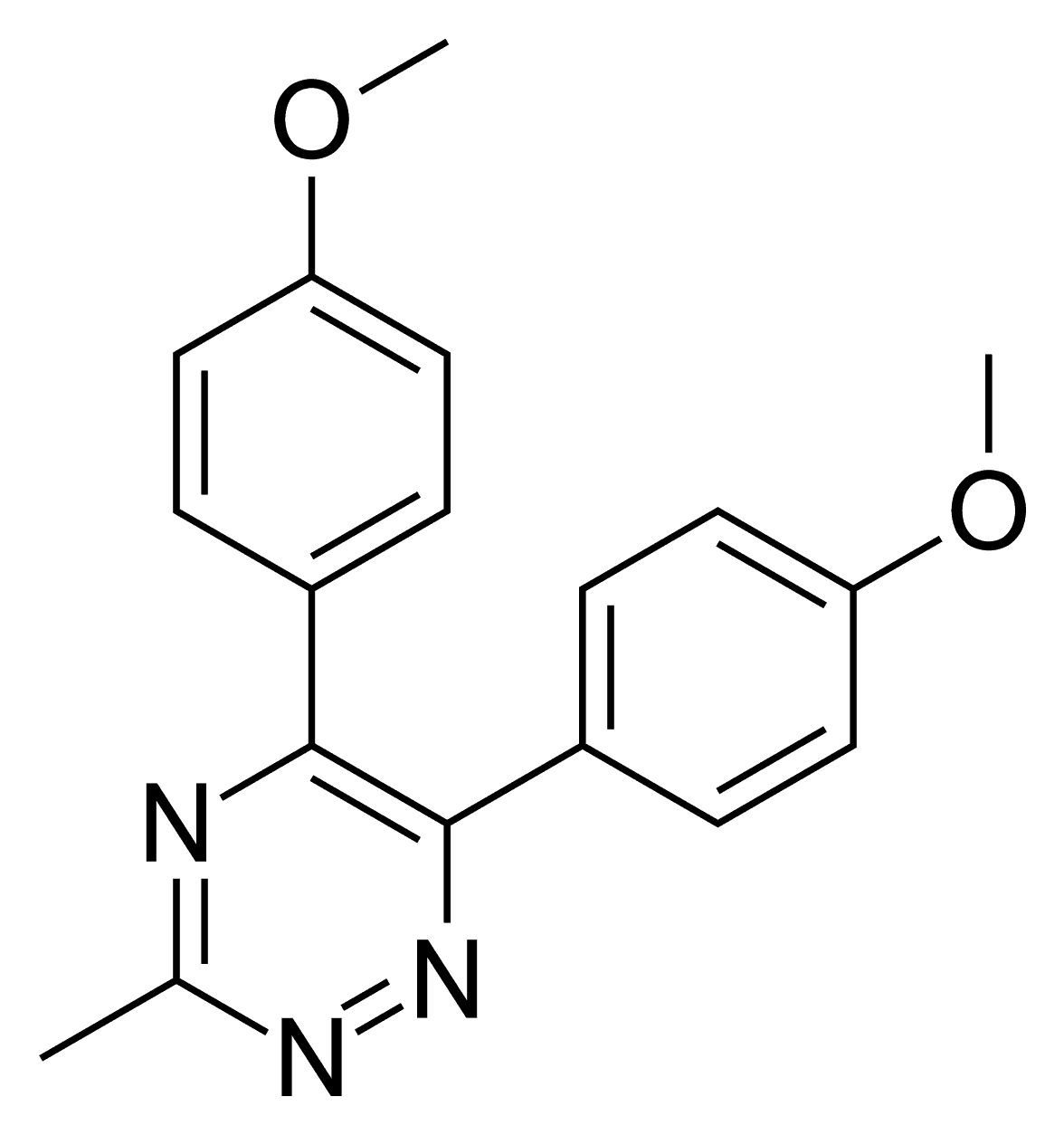

Clinical data
- ATC code: none

Identifiers
- IUPAC name: 5,6-bis(4-methoxyphenyl)-3-methyl-1,2,4-triazine
- CAS Number: 63119-27-7
- PubChem CID: 44410
- ChemSpider: 40409
- UNII: 2Y065P7MYR
- KEGG: D02948
- ChEMBL: ChEMBL2105947
- CompTox Dashboard (EPA): DTXSID50212454

Chemical and physical data
- Formula: C_{18}H_{17}N_{3}O_{2}
- Molar mass: 307.353 g·mol^{−1}
- 3D model (JSmol): Interactive image
- SMILES: n2c(nnc(c1ccc(OC)cc1)c2c3ccc(OC)cc3)C
- InChI: InChI=1S/C18H17N3O2/c1-12-19-17(13-4-8-15(22-2)9-5-13)18(21-20-12)14-6-10-16(23-3)11-7-14/h4-11H,1-3H3; Key:HDNJXZZJFPCFHG-UHFFFAOYSA-N

Anitrazifen is a drug displaying COX-2 inhibitor activity.
