= Myosin ATPase =

Class of enzymes

Identifiers
- EC no.: 3.6.4.1

Databases
- IntEnz: IntEnz view
- BRENDA: BRENDA entry
- ExPASy: NiceZyme view
- KEGG: KEGG entry
- MetaCyc: metabolic pathway
- PRIAM: profile
- PDB structures: RCSB PDB PDBe PDBsum
Search
- PMC: articles
- PubMed: articles
- NCBI: proteins

Myosin ATPase (EC 3.6.4.1) is an enzyme with systematic name ATP phosphohydrolase (actin-translocating). This enzyme catalyses the following chemical reaction:

ATP + H_{2}O $\rightleftharpoons$ ADP + phosphate

ATP hydrolysis provides energy for actomyosin contraction.

== See also ==
- Myosin
