= Pazinaclone =

Chemical compound

Clinical data
- ATC code: none

Identifiers
- IUPAC name: 2-(7-chloro-1,8-naphthyridin-2-yl)-3-[2-(1,4-dioxa-8-azaspiro[4.5]decan-8-yl)-2-oxoethyl]-3H-isoindol-1-one
- CAS Number: 103255-66-9
- PubChem CID: 59743
- ChemSpider: 53893
- UNII: MHK03047IJ
- KEGG: D05378
- ChEMBL: ChEMBL2107504
- CompTox Dashboard (EPA): DTXSID70869388

Chemical and physical data
- Formula: C_{25}H_{23}ClN_{4}O_{4}
- Molar mass: 478.93 g·mol^{−1}
- 3D model (JSmol): Interactive image
- SMILES: Clc1nc2nc(ccc2cc1)N4C(=O)c3ccccc3C4CC(=O)N6CCC5(OCCO5)CC6
- InChI: InChI=1S/C25H23ClN4O4/c26-20-7-5-16-6-8-21(28-23(16)27-20)30-19(17-3-1-2-4-18(17)24(30)32)15-22(31)29-11-9-25(10-12-29)33-13-14-34-25/h1-8,19H,9-15H2; Key:DPGKFACWOCLTCA-UHFFFAOYSA-N

Pazinaclone (DN-2327) is a sedative and anxiolytic drug in the cyclopyrrolone family of drugs. Some other cyclopyrrolone drugs include zopiclone and eszopiclone.

Pazinaclone has a very similar pharmacological profile to the benzodiazepines including sedative and anxiolytic properties, but with less amnestic effects, and at low doses it is a relatively selective anxiolytic, with sedative effects only appearing at higher doses.

Pazinaclone produces its sedative and anxiolytic effects by acting as a partial agonist at GABA_{A} benzodiazepine receptors, although pazinaclone is more subtype-selective than most benzodiazepines.

== Synthesis ==
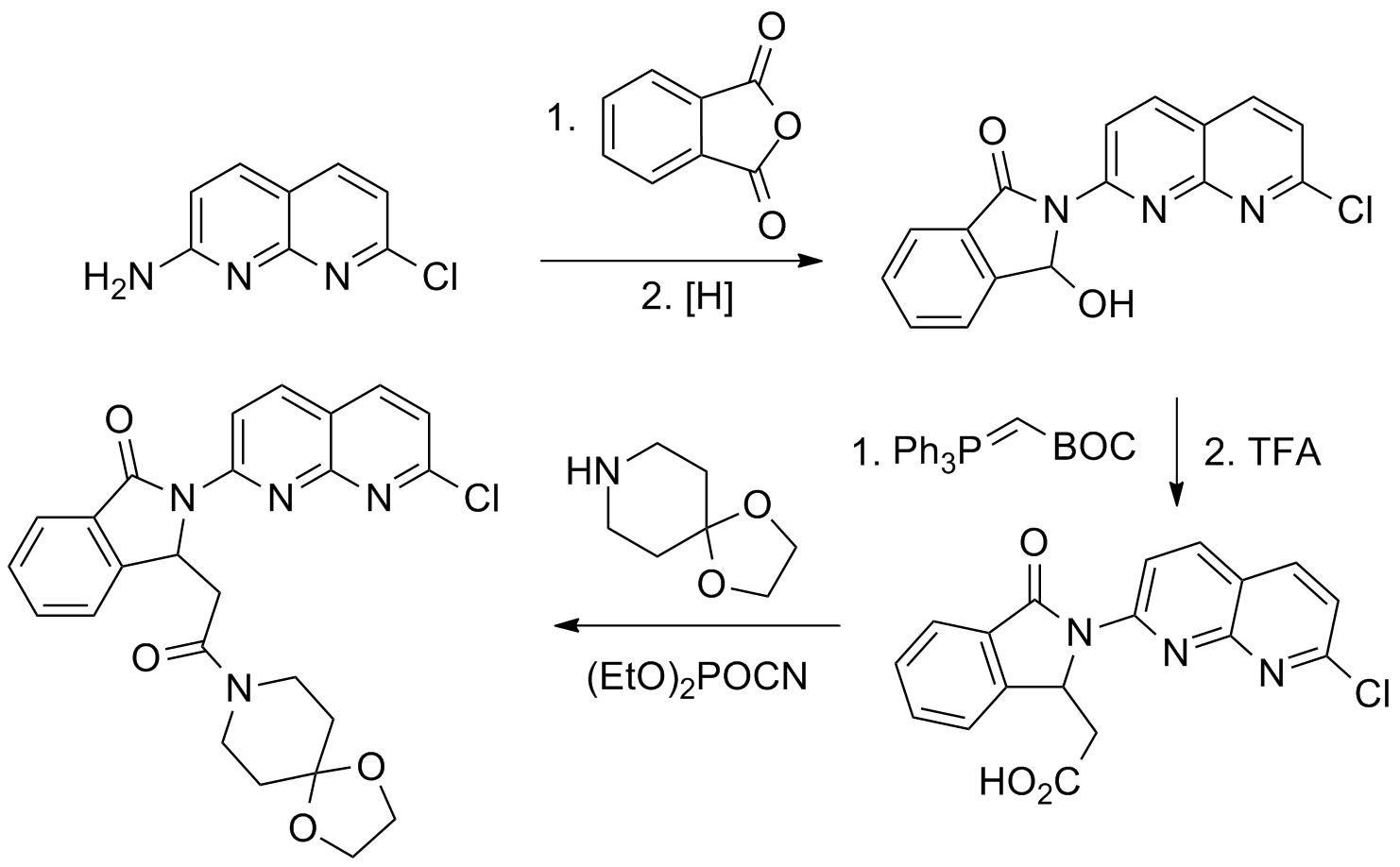
Pazinaclone synthesis: U.S. patent 4,778,801

Reaction of 2-amino-7-chloro-1,8-naphthyridine with phthalic anhydride leads to the corresponding phthalimide. Selective reduction of one of the imide carbonyl groups in essence converts that to an aldehyde. Condensation with tert-butyl(triphenylphosphoranylidene)acetate gives the Wittig product.

The carboxylic acid is then treated with diethyl cyanophosphonate to convert that to an activated acid cyanide; reaction with 1,4-dioxa-8-azaspiro[4.5]decane results in formation of the corresponding amide, pazinaclone.

== See also ==
- Pagoclone
