= Suproclone =

Drug

Clinical data
- ATC code: none

Identifiers
- IUPAC name: [6-(7-chloro-1,8-naphthyridin-2-yl)-5-oxo-3,7-dihydro-2H-[1,4]dithiino[2,3-c]pyrrol-7-yl] 4-propanoylpiperazine-1-carboxylate
- CAS Number: 76535-71-2
- PubChem CID: 53696
- ChemSpider: 48481
- UNII: J4AM5D708G
- KEGG: D05975
- ChEMBL: ChEMBL2105531
- CompTox Dashboard (EPA): DTXSID00868445
- ECHA InfoCard: 100.071.330

Chemical and physical data
- Formula: C_{22}H_{22}ClN_{5}O_{4}S_{2}
- Molar mass: 520.02 g·mol^{−1}
- 3D model (JSmol): Interactive image
- SMILES: O=C(N5CCN(C(=O)OC4C=1SCCSC=1C(=O)N4c2nc3nc(Cl)ccc3cc2)CC5)CC
- InChI: InChI=1S/C22H22ClN5O4S2/c1-2-16(29)26-7-9-27(10-8-26)22(31)32-21-18-17(33-11-12-34-18)20(30)28(21)15-6-4-13-3-5-14(23)24-19(13)25-15/h3-6,21H,2,7-12H2,1H3; Key:IBAUKGNDWVSETP-UHFFFAOYSA-N

Suproclone is a sedative and anxiolytic drug in the cyclopyrrolone family of drugs, developed by the French pharmaceutical company Rhône-Poulenc. Other cyclopyrrolone drugs include zopiclone, pagoclone and suriclone.

Suproclone is very similar in structure to the related drug suriclone, but little information has been published about it specifically. However it can be expected that the mechanism of action by which suproclone produces its sedative and anxiolytic effects is by modulating benzodiazepine receptors (resulting in an increased response to endogenous GABA), in a similar manner to other drugs of this class.

== Synthesis ==
ChemDrug Synthesis: Patent (Ex 1/15):

The condensation between 2,3-Dihydro-1,4-dithiino[2,3-c]furan-5,7-dione [10489-75-5] (1) and 7-Chloro-1,8-naphthyridin-2-amine [15944-33-9] (2) gives PC23343647 (3). Halogenation with phosphoryl chloride leads to PC23343652 (4). Reductino with potassium borohydride afforded [53788-25-3] (5). Treatment with phenyl chloroformate [1885-14-9] (6) resulted in 2-(7-chloro-1,8-naphthyridin-2-yl)-3-phenoxycarbonyloxy-isoindolin-1-one, PC23343637 (7). Reaction with piperazine [110-85-0] (8) afforded (9). Acylation with propionyl chloride completed the synthesis of Suproclone (10).
