= C17H17ClN6O3 =

The molecular formula C_{17}H_{17}ClN_{6}O_{3} (molar mass: 388.81 g/mol, exact mass: 388.1051 u) may refer to:

- Eszopiclone
- Zopiclone
