= Bretazenil =

Chemical compound

Clinical data
- ATC code: none

Pharmacokinetic data
- Elimination half-life: 2.5 hours

Identifiers
- IUPAC name: tert-butyl-8-bromo-11,12,13,13a-tetrahydro-9-oxo-9H-imidazo(1,5-a)-pyrrolo(2,1-c)(1,4)benzodiazepine-1-carboxylate
- CAS Number: 84379-13-5
- PubChem CID: 107926
- IUPHAR/BPS: 4146
- ChemSpider: 97049
- UNII: OSZ0E9DGOJ
- ChEMBL: ChEMBL366947
- CompTox Dashboard (EPA): DTXSID6046266

Chemical and physical data
- Formula: C_{19}H_{20}BrN_{3}O_{3}
- Molar mass: 418.291 g·mol^{−1}
- 3D model (JSmol): Interactive image
- SMILES: O=C(OC(C)(C)C)c1ncn2c4c(C(=O)N3[C@H](c12)CCC3)c(Br)ccc4
- InChI: InChI=1S/C19H20BrN3O3/c1-19(2,3)26-18(25)15-16-13-8-5-9-22(13)17(24)14-11(20)6-4-7-12(14)23(16)10-21-15/h4,6-7,10,13H,5,8-9H2,1-3H3/t13-/m0/s1; Key:LWUDDYHYYNNIQI-ZDUSSCGKSA-N

Bretazenil (Ro16-6028) is an imidazopyrrolobenzodiazepine anxiolytic drug which is derived from the benzodiazepine family, and was invented in 1988. It is most closely related in structure to the GABA antagonist flumazenil, although its effects are somewhat different. It is classified as a high-potency benzodiazepine due to its high affinity binding to benzodiazepine binding sites where it acts as a partial agonist. Its profile as a partial agonist and preclinical trial data suggests that it may have a reduced adverse effect profile. In particular bretazenil has been proposed to cause a less strong development of tolerance and withdrawal syndrome. Bretazenil differs from traditional 1,4-benzodiazepines by being a partial agonist and because it binds to α_{1}, α_{2}, α_{3}, α_{4}, α_{5} and α_{6} subunit containing GABA_{A} receptor benzodiazepine receptor complexes. 1,4-benzodiazepines bind only to α_{1}, α_{2}, α_{3} and α_{5} GABA_{A} benzodiazepine receptor complexes.

== History ==
Bretazenil was originally developed as an anti-anxiety drug and has been studied for its use as an anticonvulsant but has never been commercialised. It is a partial agonist for the benzodiazepine site of the GABA_{A} receptors in the brain. David Nutt from the University of Bristol has suggested bretazenil as a possible base from which to make a better social drug, as it displays several of the positive effects of alcohol intoxication such as relaxation and sociability, but without the bad effects such as aggression, amnesia, nausea, loss of coordination, liver disease and brain damage. The effects of bretazenil can also be quickly reversed by the action of flumazenil, which is used as an antidote to benzodiazepine overdose, in contrast to alcohol for which there is no effective and reliable antidote.

Traditional benzodiazepines are associated with side effects such as drowsiness, physical dependence and abuse potential. It was hoped that bretazenil and other partial agonists would be an improvement on traditional benzodiazepines which are full agonists due to preclinical evidence that their side effect profile was less than that of full agonist benzodiazepines. For a variety of reasons however, bretazenil and other partial agonists such as pazinaclone and abecarnil were not clinically successful. However, research continues into other compounds with partial agonist and compounds which are selective for certain GABA_{A} benzodiazepine receptor subtypes.

== Tolerance and dependence ==
In a study in rats, cross-tolerance between the benzodiazepine drug chlordiazepoxide and bretazenil has been demonstrated. In a primate study bretazenil was found to be able to replace the full agonist diazepam in diazepam dependent primates without precipitating withdrawal effects, demonstrating cross tolerance between bretazenil and benzodiazepine agonists, whereas other partial agonists precipitated a withdrawal syndrome. The differences are likely due to differences in instrinsic properties between different benzodiazepine partial agonists. Cross-tolerance has also been shown between bretazenil and full agonist benzodiazepines in rats. In rats tolerance is slower to develop to the anticonvulsant effects compared to the benzodiazepine site full agonist diazepam. However, tolerance developed to the anticonvulsant effects of bretazenil partial agonist more quickly than they developed to imidazenil.

== Pharmacology ==
Bretazenil has a more broad spectrum of action than traditional benzodiazepines as it has been shown to have low affinity binding to α_{4} and α_{6} GABA_{A} receptors in addition to acting on α_{1}, α_{2}, α_{3} and α_{5} subunits which traditional benzodiazepine drugs work on. The partial agonist imidazenil does not, however, act at these subunits. 0.5mg of bretazenil is approximately equivalent in its psychomotor-impairing effect to 10 mg of diazepam. Bretazenil produces marked sedative-hypnotic effects when taken alone and when combined with alcohol. This human study also indicates that bretazenil is possibly more sedative than diazepam. The reason is unknown, but the study suggests the possibility that a full-agonist metabolite may be generated in humans but not animals previously tested or else that there are significant differences in benzodiazepine receptor population in animals and humans.

In a study of monkeys bretazenil has been found to antagonize the effects of full agonist benzodiazepines. However, bretazenil has been found to enhance the effects of neurosteroids acting on the neurosteroid binding site of the GABA_{A} receptor. Another study found that bretazenil acted as an antagonist provoking withdrawal symptoms in monkeys who were physically dependent on the full agonist benzodiazepine triazolam.

Partial agonists of benzodiazepine receptors have been proposed as a possible alternative to full agonists of the benzodiazepine site to overcome the problems of tolerance, dependence and withdrawal which limits the role of benzodiazepines in the treatment of anxiety, insomnia and epilepsy. Such adverse effects appear to be less problematic with bretazenil than full agonists. Bretazenil has also been found to have less abuse potential than benzodiazepine full agonists such as diazepam and alprazolam, however long-term use of bretazenil would still be expected to result in dependence and addiction.

Bretazenil alters the sleep EEG profile and causes a reduction in cortisol secretion and increases significantly the release of prolactin. Bretazenil has effective hypnotic properties but impairs cognitive ability in humans. Bretazenil causes a reduction in the number of movements between sleep stages and delays movement into REM sleep. At a dosage of 0.5 mg of bretazenil REM sleep is decreased and stage 2 sleep is lengthened.

== See also ==
- Pagoclone
- Flumazenil
- Premazepam
- Benzodiazepine
