= Imidazenil =

Benzodiazepine drug

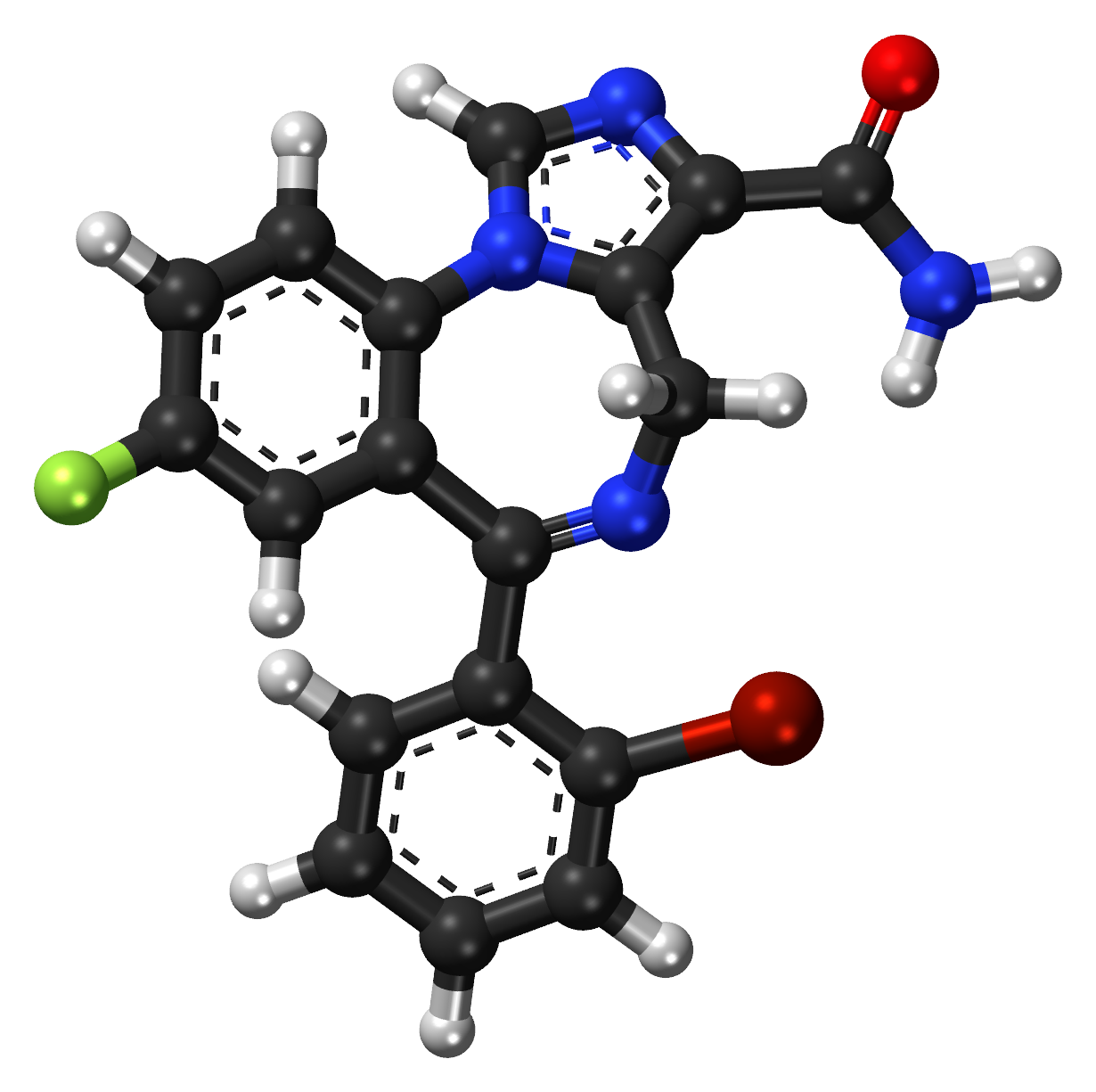

Clinical data
- ATC code: none

Identifiers
- IUPAC name: 6-(2-Bromophenyl)-8-fluoro-4H-imidazo[1,5-a][1,4]benzodiazepine-3-carboxamide
- CAS Number: 151271-08-8
- PubChem CID: 119194
- ChemSpider: 106482
- UNII: 7N95V6864R
- CompTox Dashboard (EPA): DTXSID90164746

Chemical and physical data
- Formula: C_{18}H_{12}BrFN_{4}O
- Molar mass: 399.223 g·mol^{−1}
- 3D model (JSmol): Interactive image
- SMILES: Brc4ccccc4C/2=N/Cc1c(ncn1c3c\2cc(F)cc3)C(=O)N
- InChI: InChI=1S/C18H12BrFN4O/c19-13-4-2-1-3-11(13)16-12-7-10(20)5-6-14(12)24-9-23-17(18(21)25)15(24)8-22-16/h1-7,9H,8H2,(H2,21,25); Key:OCJHYHKWUWSHEN-UHFFFAOYSA-N

Imidazenil is an experimental anxiolytic drug which is derived from the benzodiazepine family, and is most closely related to other imidazobenzodiazepines such as midazolam, flumazenil, and bretazenil.

Imidazenil is a highly potent benzodiazepine receptor partial agonist with an unusual profile of effects, producing some of the effects associated with normal benzodiazepines such as anticonvulsant and anxiolytic effects, yet without any notable sedative or amnestic effects. In fact, imidazenil blocks the sedative effects of diazepam, yet without lowering the convulsion threshold, and so potentially could be a more flexible antidote than the antagonist flumazenil which is commonly used to treat benzodiazepine overdose at present.

Imidazenil has not yet been developed commercially for use in humans, however it has been suggested as a safe and effective treatment for anxiety, a potent yet non-sedating anticonvulsant which might be particularly useful in the treatment of poisoning with organophosphate nerve agents, and as a novel treatment for schizophrenia.

In rats, imidazenil has been demonstrated to have low tolerance or dependence liability, unlike other benzodiazepine receptor agonist ligands, such as diazepam, bretazenil.

== Pharmacodynamics ==
Imidazenil is selective over the type of GABA_{A} receptor it acts on. It acts as a partial agonist on those with a α_{1}β_{2}γ_{2S} composition and as a full agonist on those with a α_{5}β_{2}γ_{2S} composition. Its action can be compared to that of clobazam, another anxioselective benzodiazepine. Clobazam's active metabolite N-desmethylclobazam has lower affinity on receptors with an α_{1} subunit compared to those with an α_{2}. It is believed that the subjective, ataxic, and sedative properties are mediated via α_{1}-containing receptors, while the anxiolytic effects are mediated via the ones with α_{2}, α_{3}, or α_{5}.

== See also ==
- 2′-Bromonordazepam
- Flumazenil
- Bretazenil
- GL-II-73
- Midazolam
