= Pagoclone =

Chemical compound

Clinical data
- ATC code: none

Identifiers
- IUPAC name: 2-(7-chloro-1,8-naphthyridin-2-yl)-3-(5-methyl-2-oxohexyl)isoindolin-1-one
- CAS Number: 133737-32-3
- PubChem CID: 131664
- ChemSpider: 116335
- UNII: 38VAG2SA33
- KEGG: D02616
- ChEMBL: ChEMBL2104745
- CompTox Dashboard (EPA): DTXSID40869830

Chemical and physical data
- Formula: C_{23}H_{22}ClN_{3}O_{2}
- Molar mass: 407.90 g·mol^{−1}
- 3D model (JSmol): Interactive image
- SMILES: Clc1nc2nc(ccc2cc1)N4C(=O)c3ccccc3C4CC(=O)CCC(C)C
- InChI: InChI=1S/C23H22ClN3O2/c1-14(2)7-10-16(28)13-19-17-5-3-4-6-18(17)23(29)27(19)21-12-9-15-8-11-20(24)25-22(15)26-21/h3-6,8-9,11-12,14,19H,7,10,13H2,1-2H3; Key:HIUPRQPBWVEQJJ-UHFFFAOYSA-N

Pagoclone is an anxiolytic agent from the cyclopyrrolone family, related to better-known drugs such as the sleeping medication zopiclone. It was synthesized by a French team working for Rhone-Poulenc & Rorer S.A. Pagoclone belongs to the class of nonbenzodiazepines, which have similar effects to the older benzodiazepine group, but with quite different chemical structures. It was never commercialised.

It binds with roughly equivalent high affinity (0.7–9.1 nM) to the benzodiazepine binding site of human GABA_{A} receptors containing either an α1, α2, α3 or α5 subunit. It is a partial agonist at α1-, α2- and α5-containing GABAA receptors and a full agonist at receptors containing an α3 subunit. In rats 5′-hydroxypagoclone was identified as a major metabolite. This metabolite has a considerably greater efficacy at the α1 subtype than the parent compound and was shown to have significant anxiolytic-like activity and to produce sedation. In contrast to zopiclone, pagoclone produces anxiolytic effects with little sedative or amnestic actions at low doses (0.3mg to 1.2mg per day).

The pharmacologist David Nutt has suggested pagoclone as a possible base from which to make a better social drug, as it produces the positive effects of alcohol, such as relaxation and sociability, but without also causing the negative effects like aggression, amnesia, nausea, loss of coordination and liver damage. Its effect can be quickly reversed by the action of flumazenil, which is already used as an antidote to benzodiazepine overdose. Nutt has published studies praising the potential of pagoclone which were financed by Indevus which was seeking funding for a possible production of the compound. The long-term safety of pagoclone has not been assessed. The abuse potential of pagoclone has been assessed as being similar to, or slightly less than that of diazepam and it would also be expected to be somewhat safer due to its relatively weaker sedative effects, but development of pagoclone as a commercial drug would still be unlikely due to concerns about abuse.

Pagoclone was trialed as a drug to improve speech fluency as a treatment for stuttering, but research for this application was discontinued following disappointing results in Phase II clinical trials.

== Synthesis ==
Pagoclone and pazinaclone both contain an isoindolone structural motif

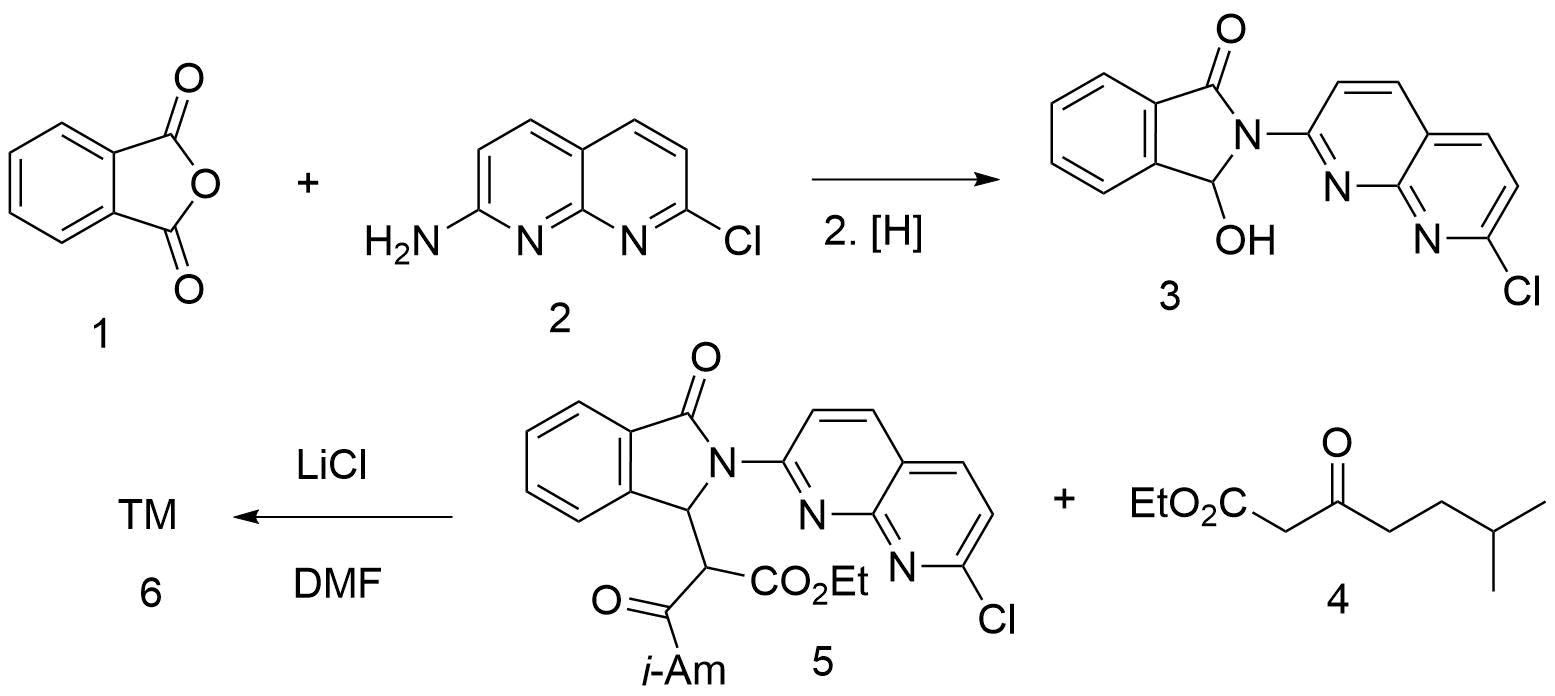
Pagoclone synthesis: U.S. patent 4,960,779

Reaction of phthalic anhydride [85-44-9] (1) with 2-Amino-7-chloro-1,8-naphthyridine [15944-33-9] (2) with leads to the corresponding phthalimide. Selective reduction of one of the imide carbonyl groups give the corresponding alcohol, 2-(7-chloro-1,8-naphthyridin-2-yl)-3-hydroxyisoindolin-1-one [55112-38-4] (3). Reaction with the carbanion from Ethyl 5-methyl-3-oxohexanoate [57689-16-4] (4) leads to the product from the displacement of the hydroxyl group; 'this too may proceed via the acrylate obtained from aldol reaction of the ring opened imidal'. The product of this step is Ethyl 2-[2-(7-chloro-1,8-naphthyridin-2-yl)-3-oxo-1-isoindolinyl]-6-methyl-3-oxoheptanoate, PC9891305 (5).

== See also ==
- Bretazenil
- Stuttering
- Basal ganglia
- GABA
