= Suriclone =

Chemical compound

Clinical data
- ATC code: none

Identifiers
- IUPAC name: [6-(7-chloro-1,8-naphthyridin-2-yl)-5-oxo-3,7-dihydro-2H-[1,4]dithiino[2,3-c]pyrrol-7-yl] 4-methylpiperazine-1-carboxylate
- CAS Number: 53813-83-5
- PubChem CID: 40903
- ChemSpider: 37353
- UNII: LNC9G689VR
- ChEMBL: ChEMBL2105561
- CompTox Dashboard (EPA): DTXSID20866362
- ECHA InfoCard: 100.053.431

Chemical and physical data
- Formula: C_{20}H_{20}ClN_{5}O_{3}S_{2}
- Molar mass: 477.98 g·mol^{−1}
- 3D model (JSmol): Interactive image
- SMILES: Clc4nc5nc(N3C(=O)C=1SCCSC=1C3OC(=O)N2CCN(C)CC2)ccc5cc4
- InChI: InChI=1S/C20H20ClN5O3S2/c1-24-6-8-25(9-7-24)20(28)29-19-16-15(30-10-11-31-16)18(27)26(19)14-5-3-12-2-4-13(21)22-17(12)23-14/h2-5,19H,6-11H2,1H3; Key:RMXOUBDDDQUBKD-UHFFFAOYSA-N

Suriclone (Suril) is a sedative and anxiolytic drug in the cyclopyrrolone family of drugs. Other cyclopyrrolone drugs include zopiclone and pagoclone.

Suriclone has a very similar pharmacological profile to the benzodiazepine family of drugs including sedative and anxiolytic properties but with less amnestic effects, and its chemical structure is quite different from that of the benzodiazepine drugs.

The mechanism of action by which suriclone produces its sedative and anxiolytic effects is by modulating GABA_{A} receptors, although suriclone is more subtype-selective than most benzodiazepines.
