= Cyclopyrrolones =

Class of chemical hypnotics

Skeletal formula of the parent compound, cyclopyrrolone

Cyclopyrrolones are a family of hypnotic and anxiolytic nonbenzodiazepine drugs with similar pharmacological profiles to the benzodiazepine derivatives.

Although cyclopyrrolones are chemically unrelated to benzodiazepines, they function via the benzodiazepine receptor of neurotransmitter GABA. The best-known cyclopyrrolone derivatives are zopiclone (Imovane) and its active single-enantiomer component, eszopiclone (Lunesta), which are used to treat insomnia, and have a known potential for abuse. Other cyclopyrrolones include:

- Pagoclone – anxiolytic
- Pazinaclone – anxiolytic
- Suproclone – anxiolytic
- Suriclone – anxiolytic
