= Desmethylzopiclone =

Major metabolite of the hypnotic medication zopiclone

Clinical data
- Other names: SEP-174559

Identifiers
- IUPAC name: [6-(5-chloropyridin-2-yl)-5-oxo-7H-pyrrolo[3,4-b]pyrazin-7-yl] piperazine-1-carboxylate
- CAS Number: 59878-63-6
- PubChem CID: 162892
- ChemSpider: 143002
- UNII: DJL5TX7YTA
- CompTox Dashboard (EPA): DTXSID10866775

Chemical and physical data
- Formula: C_{16}H_{15}ClN_{6}O_{3}
- Molar mass: 374.79 g·mol^{−1}
- 3D model (JSmol): Interactive image
- SMILES: C1CN(CCN1)C(=O)OC2C3=NC=CN=C3C(=O)N2C4=NC=C(C=C4)Cl
- InChI: InChI=InChI=1S/C16H15ClN6O3/c17-10-1-2-11(21-9-10)23-14(24)12-13(20-4-3-19-12)15(23)26-16(25)22-7-5-18-6-8-22/h1-4,9,15,18H,5-8H2; Key:CGSFZSTXVVJLIX-UHFFFAOYSA-N

Desmethylzopiclone, also known as SEP-174559, is an active metabolite of the sedative-hypnotic drug zopiclone.

== Pharmacology ==
Unlike its parent compound, which is a largely non-selective benzodiazepine receptor agonist, desmethylzopiclone is a selective partial agonist at the benzodiazepine site of α3-containing GABA receptor subtypes. It is also an antagonist to nicotinic acetylcholine receptors and NMDA receptors.

Desmethylzopiclone has been described as a potential anxio-selective metabolite of zolpiclone owing to its selective affinity for the modulation of α3-containing GABA receptor subtypes. Modulation of these GABA_{A} subtypes have been implicated as key mediators of the anxiolytic effects of benzodiazepines.

== In forensic analysis ==
A method for the quantification of desmethylzopiclone from urine has been developed and may serve useful in forensic analysis of cases involving zolpiclone intoxication.
