= Suxethonium chloride =

Chemical compound

Identifiers
- IUPAC name: 2,2’-[(1,4-Dioxo-1,4-butanediyl)bis(oxy)]bis(N-ethyl-N,N-dimethylethanaminium) dichloride
- CAS Number: 54063-57-9
- PubChem CID: 71732
- ChemSpider: 64776
- UNII: U5026H7S5S
- KEGG: D08553
- ChEMBL: ChEMBL2107598
- CompTox Dashboard (EPA): DTXSID20218004
- ECHA InfoCard: 100.053.581

Chemical and physical data
- Formula: C_{16}H_{34}Cl_{2}N_{2}O_{4}
- Molar mass: 389.36 g·mol^{−1}
- 3D model (JSmol): Interactive image
- SMILES: CC[N+](C)(C)CCOC(=O)CCC(=O)OCC[N+](C)(C)CC.[Cl-].[Cl-]
- InChI: InChI=1S/C16H34N2O4.2ClH/c1-7-17(3,4)11-13-21-15(19)9-10-16(20)22-14-12-18(5,6)8-2;;/h7-14H2,1-6H3;2*1H/q+2;;/p-2; Key:BHCKTCGQZMCGAB-UHFFFAOYSA-L

Suxethonium (trade name: Brevidil-E) is a depolarising muscle relaxant which is presented as a dry powder in an ampoule. This is re-constituted with sterile water prior to use. It is available in Australia as a schedule 4 drug, and the US.

== Advantages ==
It has some advantages over suxamethonium:

- Less K^{+}
- Possibly less muscle pain after use
- Storage does not require refrigeration

The last advantage was what keeps it in occasional use.

== Previous use ==
In the UK, it was used by the Obstetric Flying Squads at patient's homes to resuscitate mothers during major obstetric complications (mostly major haemorrhage) during home births.

In Australia, it was included in "Resuscitation drugs packs" in hospitals. These packs were sealed boxes containing all the drugs required for an in-hospital resuscitation. They were prepared by the hospital pharmacy and because these were sealed (usually just sticky tape) the drug contents were guaranteed to be there for use in a cardiac arrest. These packs contained ampoules of powdered suxethonium so a relaxant was available to facilitate intubation. Suxamethonium could not be used in these packs because of the requirement for refrigeration. This was certainly an issue in Queensland as it could be quite warm and hospitals wards were in the past generally not air-conditioned.

It can still be used where the storage issue is a concern (e.g. by the military, rural locations, 3rd world countries). The most recent reference to it in Medline is 1976, but it is occasionally mentioned in passing in other journals.
