= Suvizumab =

Monoclonal antibody

Monoclonal antibody
- Type: Whole antibody
- Source: Humanized
- Target: HIV-1

Clinical data
- ATC code: none

Identifiers
- CAS Number: 914257-21-9
- ChemSpider: none
- UNII: 4AJ2TI6DPI

Suvizumab is an experimental antiviral drug and immunomodulator. It is a monoclonal antibody that binds to HIV-1.
