= Sutezolid =

Chemical compound

Clinical data
- Other names: PNU-100480, PF-02341272

Identifiers
- IUPAC name: N-[[(5S)-3-(3-fluoro-4-thiomorpholin-4-ylphenyl)-2-oxo-1,3-oxazolidin-5-yl]methyl]acetamide
- CAS Number: 168828-58-8
- PubChem CID: 465951
- DrugBank: DB11905
- ChemSpider: 409595
- UNII: 3A71182L8P
- KEGG: D10167
- ChEMBL: ChEMBL288149
- CompTox Dashboard (EPA): DTXSID20168611
- ECHA InfoCard: 100.237.103

Chemical and physical data
- Formula: C_{16}H_{20}FN_{3}O_{3}S
- Molar mass: 353.41 g·mol^{−1}
- 3D model (JSmol): Interactive image
- SMILES: CC(=O)NC[C@H]1CN(C(=O)O1)C2=CC(=C(C=C2)N3CCSCC3)F
- InChI: InChI=InChI=1S/C16H20FN3O3S/c1-11(21)18-9-13-10-20(16(22)23-13)12-2-3-15(14(17)8-12)19-4-6-24-7-5-19/h2-3,8,13H,4-7,9-10H2,1H3,(H,18,21)/t13-/m0/s1; Key:FNDDDNOJWPQCBZ-ZDUSSCGKSA-N

Sutezolid is an investigational new drug that is being evaluated for the treatment of extensively drug-resistant tuberculosis. It differs from linezolid by replacement of the morpholine oxygen with a sulfur atom. Like linezolid, sutezolid is a bacterial protein synthesis inhibitor. In preclinical studies, sutezolid demonstrated superior antituberculosis activity compared to linezolid.
