= Sodium sulfate/magnesium sulfate/potassium chloride =

Combination medication

Combination of
- Sodium sulfate: Electrolyte
- Magnesium sulfate (medication): Electrolyte
- Potassium chloride (medication): Electrolyte

Clinical data
- Trade names: Sutab
- AHFS/Drugs.com: Multum Consumer Information
- MedlinePlus: a619013
- License data: US DailyMed: Sodium sulfate, potassium sulfate, magnesium sulfate
- Routes of administration: By mouth

Legal status
- Legal status: US: ℞-only

Sodium sulfate/magnesium sulfate/potassium chloride, sold under the brand names Suprep Bowel Prep and Sutab, is a fixed-dose combination medication used for cleansing of the colon in preparation for colonoscopy. It contains sodium sulfate, magnesium sulfate, and potassium chloride. It is an osmotic laxative.

Sodium sulfate/magnesium sulfate/potassium chloride was approved for medical use in the United States in 2020.

== Medical uses ==
Sodium sulfate/magnesium sulfate/potassium chloride, as Suprep Bowel Prep, is indicated for cleansing of the colon in preparation for colonoscopy in people aged twelve years of age and older.

Sodium sulfate/magnesium sulfate/potassium chloride, as Sutab, is indicated for cleansing of the colon in preparation for colonoscopy in adults.
