= Suplatast tosilate =

Chemical compound

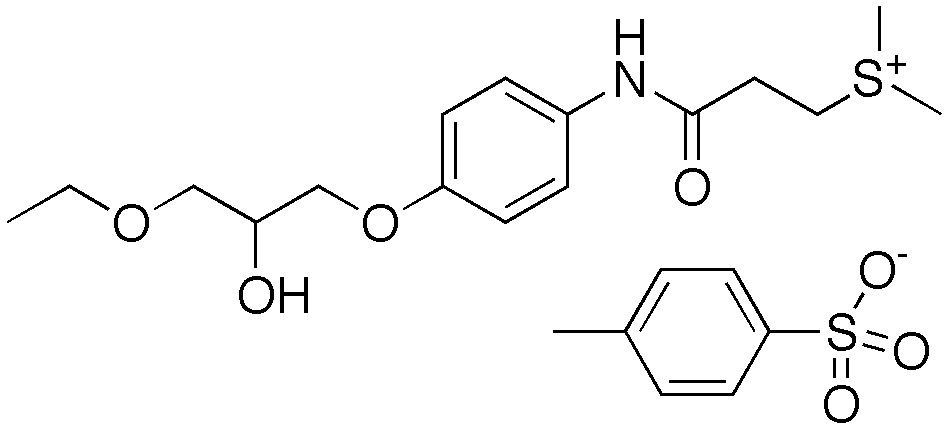

Clinical data
- AHFS/Drugs.com: International Drug Names
- Routes of administration: Oral
- ATC code: none

Legal status
- Legal status: In general: ℞ (Prescription only)

Identifiers
- IUPAC name: (3-{[4-(3-ethoxy-2-hydroxypropoxy)phenyl]amino}-3-oxopropyl)(dimethyl)sulfonium 4-methylbenzenesulfonate
- CAS Number: 94055-76-2
- PubChem CID: 71773
- ChemSpider: 64811
- UNII: C9J89787U1
- KEGG: D01423
- ChEMBL: ChEMBL115435
- CompTox Dashboard (EPA): DTXSID9045003
- ECHA InfoCard: 100.220.132

Chemical and physical data
- Formula: C_{23}H_{33}NO_{7}S_{2}
- Molar mass: 499.64 g·mol^{−1}
- 3D model (JSmol): Interactive image
- SMILES: CCOCC(COC1=CC=C(C=C1)NC(=O)CC[S+](C)C)O.CC1=CC=C(C=C1)S(=O)(=O)[O-]
- InChI: InChI=1S/C16H25NO4S.C7H8O3S/c1-4-20-11-14(18)12-21-15-7-5-13(6-8-15)17-16(19)9-10-22(2)3;1-6-2-4-7(5-3-6)11(8,9)10/h5-8,14,18H,4,9-12H2,1-3H3;2-5H,1H3,(H,8,9,10); Key:RYVJQEZJUFRANT-UHFFFAOYSA-N

Suplatast tosilate (INN) is an inhibitor of cytokine T helper cells. Overstimulation of these T_{h}2 cells can lead to an allergic reaction, so the drug is used as an antihistamine. It has also been used in the treatment of Kimura's disease.

== Synthesis ==

Acylation of 1-(4-aminophenoxy)-3-ethoxypropan-2-ol (1) with 3-methylthiopropionyl chloride (2) gives the amide (3). Methylation of the thioether using methyl tosylate (4) yields suplatast as its toluenesulfonic acid salt.
