= Eszopiclone =

Hypnotic medication

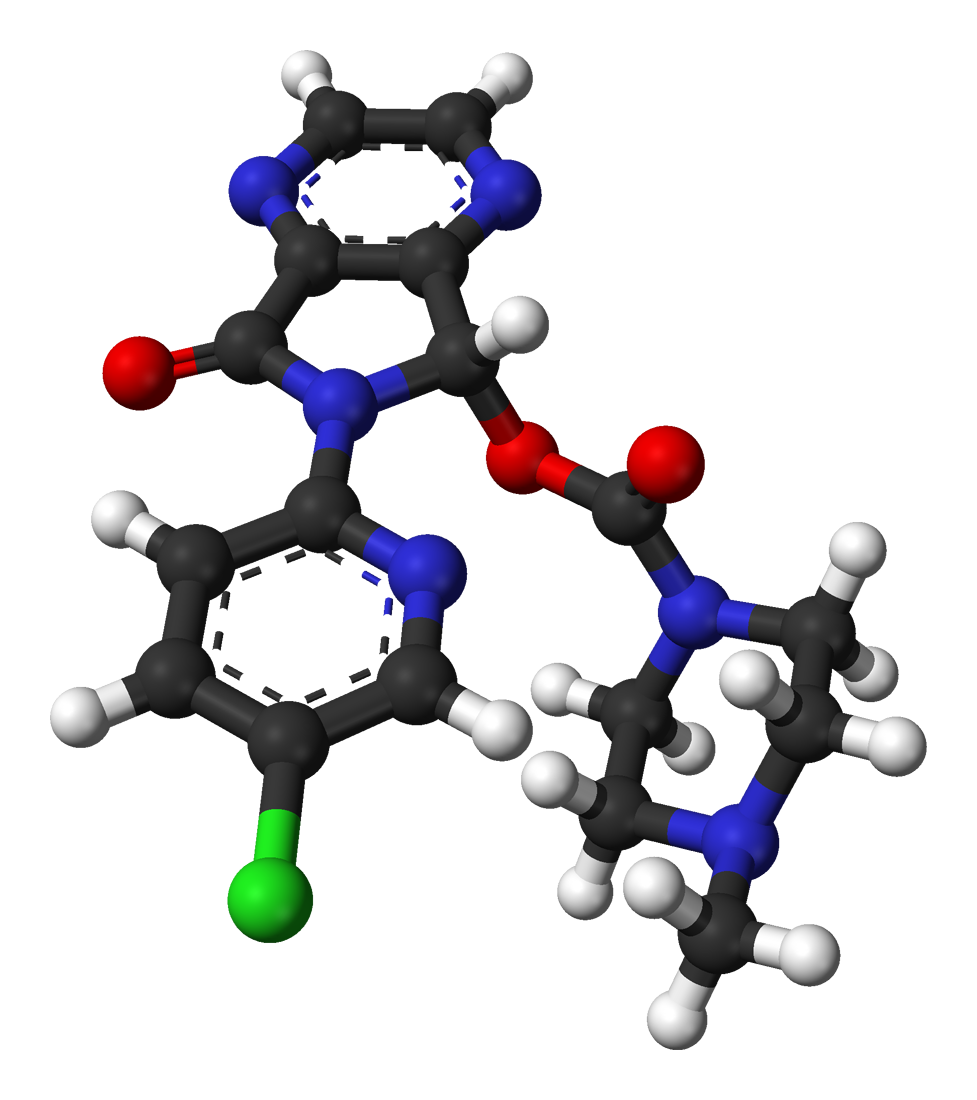

Clinical data
- Trade names: Lunesta, Eszop, others
- AHFS/Drugs.com: Monograph
- MedlinePlus: a605009
- License data: US DailyMed: Eszopiclone; US FDA: Eszopiclone
- Dependence liability: High
- Addiction liability: Modreate
- Routes of administration: By mouth
- ATC code: N05CF04 (WHO)

Legal status
- Legal status: BR: Class B1 (Psychoactive drugs); US: Schedule IV

Pharmacokinetic data
- Protein binding: 52–59%
- Metabolism: Liver oxidation and demethylation (CYP3A4 and CYP2E1-mediated)
- Elimination half-life: 6 hours
- Excretion: Kidney

Identifiers
- IUPAC name: (S)-(+)-6-(5-Chloro-2-pyridinyl)-7-oxo-6,7-dihydro-5H-pyrrolo[3,4-b]pyrazin-5-yl-4-methyl-1-piperazinecarboxylate
- CAS Number: 138729-47-2
- PubChem CID: 969472
- IUPHAR/BPS: 7429
- DrugBank: DB00402
- ChemSpider: 839530
- UNII: UZX80K71OE
- KEGG: D02624
- ChEBI: CHEBI:53760
- ChEMBL: ChEMBL1522
- CompTox Dashboard (EPA): DTXSID8046086
- ECHA InfoCard: 100.149.304

Chemical and physical data
- Formula: C_{17}H_{17}ClN_{6}O_{3}
- Molar mass: 388.81 g·mol^{−1}
- 3D model (JSmol): Interactive image
- SMILES: O=C(O[C@H]3c1nccnc1C(=O)N3c2ncc(Cl)cc2)N4CCN(C)CC4
- InChI: InChI=1S/C17H17ClN6O3/c1-22-6-8-23(9-7-22)17(26)27-16-14-13(19-4-5-20-14)15(25)24(16)12-3-2-11(18)10-21-12/h2-5,10,16H,6-9H2,1H3/t16-/m0/s1; Key:GBBSUAFBMRNDJC-INIZCTEOSA-N

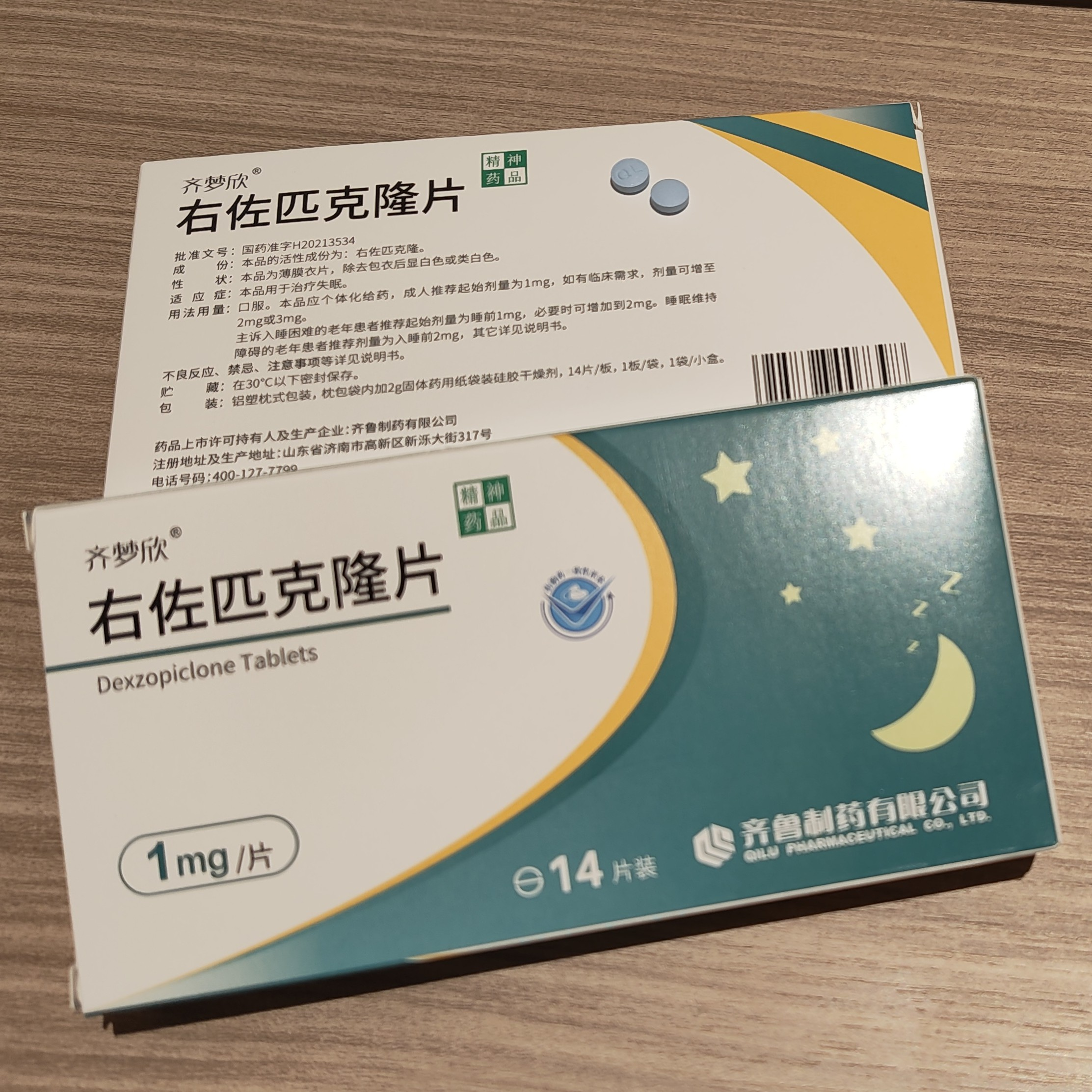
1mg Dexzopiclone (Eszopiclone) tablets from China

Eszopiclone, sold under the brand name Lunesta among others, is a nonbenzodiazepine medication used in the treatment of short-term and long-term insomnia. It is one of the few FDA-approved hypnotic medications with a controlled substance designation that does not have restrictions on its length of use. Evidence supports benefits up to six months, with some studies suggesting similar efficacy after 12 months. It is taken by mouth.

Eszopiclone's primary mechanism of action involves enhancing the natural effect of GABA receptors by acting as a positive allosteric modulator on GABA-A expressing neurons. Common side effects include headache, dry mouth, nausea, and dizziness. Severe side effects may include suicidal thoughts, hallucinations, and angioedema. Rapid decreasing of the dose may result in withdrawal. Eszopiclone is classified as a nonbenzodiazepine or Z-drug and a sedative and hypnotic of the cyclopyrrolone group. It is the S-stereoisomer of zopiclone.

Approved for medical use in the United States in 2004, eszopiclone is available as a generic medication. In 2020, it was the 232nd most commonly prescribed medication in the United States, with more than 1 million prescriptions. Eszopiclone is not sold in the European Union; as of 2009, the European Medicines Agency (EMA) ruled that it was too similar to zopiclone to be considered a new active substance.

== Medical uses ==
A 2018 Cochrane review found that it produced moderate improvement in sleep onset and maintenance. The authors suggest that where preferred non-pharmacological treatment strategies have been exhausted, eszopiclone provides an efficient treatment for insomnia. In 2014, the US Food and Drug Administration asked that the starting dose be lowered from 2 milligrams to 1 milligram after it was observed in a study that even eight hours after taking the drug at night, some people were not able to cope with their next-day activities like driving and other activities that require full alertness.

Eszopiclone is slightly effective in the treatment of insomnia where difficulty in falling asleep is the primary complaint. The benefit over placebo was found to be of questionable clinical significance. Although the drug effect and the placebo response were rather small and of questionable clinical importance, the two together produce a reasonably large clinical response.

=== Elderly ===
Sedative hypnotic drugs including eszopiclone are more commonly prescribed to the elderly than to younger patients despite benefits of medication being generally unimpressive.

In 2015, the American Geriatrics Society reviewed the safety information about eszopiclone and similar drugs and concluded that the "nonbenzodiazepine, benzodiazepine receptor agonist hypnotics (eszopiclone, zaleplon, zolpidem) are to be avoided without consideration of duration of use because of their association with harms balanced with their minimal efficacy in treating insomnia."

The review made this determination both because of the relatively large dangers to elderly individuals from zolpidem and other "z-drugs" together with the fact the drugs have "minimal efficacy in treating insomnia." This was a change from the 2012 AGS recommendation, which suggested limiting use to 90 days or less. The review stated: "the 90‐day‐use caveat [was] removed from nonbenzodiazepine, benzodiazepine receptor agonist hypnotics, resulting in an unambiguous 'avoid' statement (without caveats) because of the increase in the evidence of harm in this area since the 2012 update."

An extensive review of the medical literature regarding the management of insomnia and the elderly found that there is considerable evidence of the effectiveness and durability of non-drug treatments for insomnia in adults of all ages and that these interventions are underutilized. Compared with the benzodiazepines, the nonbenzodiazepine sedative-hypnotics, including eszopiclone appeared to offer few, if any, significant clinical advantages in efficacy or tolerability in elderly persons. It was found that newer agents with novel mechanisms of action and improved safety profiles, such as the melatonin receptor agonists, hold promise for the management of chronic insomnia in elderly people. Long-term use of sedative-hypnotics for insomnia lacks an evidence base and has traditionally been discouraged for reasons that include concerns about such potential adverse drug effects as cognitive impairment (anterograde amnesia), daytime sedation, motor incoordination, and increased risk of motor vehicle accidents and falls. In addition, the effectiveness and safety of long-term use of these agents remain to be determined. It was concluded that more research is needed to evaluate the long-term effects of treatment and the most appropriate management strategy for elderly persons with chronic insomnia.

A 2009 meta-analysis found a higher rate of infections.

== Adverse effects ==
Sleeping pills, including eszopiclone, have been associated with an increased risk of death.

Hypersensitivity to eszopiclone is a contraindication to its use. The presence of liver impairment, lactation and activities requiring mental alertness (e.g., driving) may be considered when determining frequency and dosage.

- unpleasant taste
- headache
- peripheral edema
- chest pain
- abnormal thinking
- behavior changes
- depression
- hallucinations
- sleep driving and sleepwalking
- dry mouth
- rash
- altered sleep patterns
- impaired coordination
- dizziness
- daytime drowsiness
- itching
- painful or frequent urination
- back pain
- aggressive behavior
- confusion
- agitation
- suicidal thoughts
- depersonalization
- amnesia

A 2009 meta-analysis found a 44% higher rate of mild infections, such as pharyngitis or sinusitis, in people taking eszopiclone or other hypnotic drugs compared to those taking a placebo.

=== Dependence ===
In the United States, eszopiclone is a schedule IV controlled substance under the Controlled Substances Act. Use of eszopiclone may lead to physical and psychological dependence. The risk of non-medical use and dependence increases with the dose and duration of usage and concomitant use of other psychoactive substances. The risk is also greater in patients with a history of alcohol use disorder or other substance use disorder or history of psychiatric disorders. Tolerance may develop after repeated use of benzodiazepines and benzodiazepine-like drugs for a few weeks.

A study funded and carried out by Sepracor, the manufacturer of eszopiclone, found no signs of tolerance or dependence in a group of patients followed for up to six months.

=== Non-medical use ===
A study of non-medical use potential of eszopiclone found that in persons with a known history of non-medical benzodiazepine use, eszopiclone at doses of 6 and 12 mg produced effects similar to those of diazepam 20 mg. The study found that at these doses which are two or more times greater than the maximum recommended doses, a dose-related increase in reports of amnesia, sedation, sleepiness, and hallucinations was observed for both eszopiclone (Lunesta) as well as for diazepam (Valium).

=== Overdose ===
Overdoses of eszopiclone up to 90 times the recommended dose have been reported in which the patient fully recovered. Fatalities have been reported only in cases in which eszopiclone was combined with other drugs or alcohol. Overdose may be successfully treated with flumazenil, a GABA_{A} receptor antagonist used also for benzodiazepine overdose.

Poison control centers reported that between 2005 and 2006 there were 525 total eszopiclone overdoses recorded in the state of Texas, the majority of which were intentional suicide attempts.

If consumed within the last hour, eszopiclone overdose can be treated with the administration of activated charcoal or via gastric lavage.

== Interactions ==
There is an increased risk of central nervous system depression when eszopiclone is taken together with other CNS depressant agents, including antipsychotics, sedative hypnotics (like barbiturates or benzodiazepines), antihistamines, opioids, phenothiazines, and some antidepressants. There is also increased risk of central nervous system depression with other medications that inhibit the metabolic activities of the CYP3A4 enzyme system of the liver. Substances that inhibit this enzyme system include nelfinavir, ritonavir, ketoconazole, itraconazole, clarithromycin and grapefruit juice. Alcohol also has an additive effect when used concurrently with eszopiclone. Eszopiclone is most effective if it is not taken after a heavy meal with high fat content.

== Pharmacology ==
Eszopiclone acts on benzodiazepine binding site situated on GABA_{A} neurons as a positive allosteric modulator.

Eszopiclone is rapidly absorbed after oral administration, with serum levels peaking between .45 and 1.3 hours. The elimination half-life of eszopiclone is approximately 6 hours and it is extensively metabolized by oxidation and demethylation. Approximately 52% to 59% of a dose is weakly bound to plasma protein. Cytochrome P450 (CYP) isozymes CYP3A4 and CYP2E1 are involved in the biotransformation of eszopiclone; thus, drugs that induce or inhibit these CYP isozymes may affect the metabolism of eszopiclone. Less than 10% of the orally administered dose is excreted in the urine as racemic zopiclone. In terms of benzodiazepine receptor binding and relevant potency, 3 mg of eszopiclone is equivalent to 10 mg of diazepam.

== History ==
In a controversial 2009 article in the New England Journal of Medicine, "Lost in Transmission — FDA Drug Information That Never Reaches Clinicians", it was reported that the largest of three Lunesta trials found that compared to placebo Lunesta "was superior to placebo" while it only shortened initial time falling asleep by 15 minutes on average. "Clinicians who are interested in the drug's efficacy cannot find efficacy information in the label: it states only that Lunesta is superior to placebo. The FDA's medical review provides efficacy data, albeit not until page 306 of the 403-page document. In the longest, largest phase 3 trial, patients in the Lunesta group reported falling asleep an average of 15 minutes faster and sleeping an average of 37 minutes longer than those in the placebo group. However, on average, Lunesta patients still met criteria for insomnia and reported no clinically meaningful improvement in next-day alertness or functioning."

=== Availability in Europe ===
On September 11, 2007, Sepracor signed a marketing deal with British pharmaceutical company GlaxoSmithKline for the rights to sell eszopiclone (under the name Lunivia rather than Lunesta) in Europe. Sepracor was expected to receive approximately $155 million if the deal went through. In 2008 Sepracor submitted an application to the EMA (the European Union's equivalent to the U.S. FDA) for authorization to market the drug in the EU, and initially received a favorable response. However, Sepracor withdrew its authorization application in 2009 after the EMA stated it would not be granting eszopiclone 'new active substance' status, as it was essentially pharmacologically and therapeutically too similar to zopiclone to be considered a new patentable product. Since the patent on zopiclone has expired, this ruling would have allowed rival companies to also legally produce cheaper generic versions of eszopiclone for the European market. As of November 2012, Sepracor has not resubmitted its authorization application and eszopiclone is not available in Europe. The deal with GSK fell through, and GSK instead launched a $3.3 billion deal to market Actelion's almorexant sleeping tablet, which entered phase 3 medical trials before development was abandoned due to side effects.

Since 2020 eszopiclone is available under the brand name Esogno in various European countries marketed by GL Pharma.
