= Drug-induced amnesia =

Loss of memory caused by psychoactive substances

Drug-induced amnesia is amnesia caused by drugs. Amnesia may be therapeutic for medical treatment or for medical procedures, or it may be a side-effect of a drug, such as alcohol, or certain medications for psychiatric disorders, such as benzodiazepines. It is seen also with slow acting parenteral general anaesthetics.

== Medical usage ==
Amnesia is desirable during surgery, so general anaesthesia procedures are designed to induce it for the duration of the operation. Sedatives such as benzodiazepines, which are commonly used for anxiety disorders, can reduce the encoding of new memories, particularly in high doses (for example, prior to surgery in order for a person not to recall the surgery). Amnestic drugs can be used to induce a coma for a child breathing using mechanical ventilation, or to help reduce intracranial pressure after head trauma.

Researchers are currently experimenting with drugs which induce amnesia in order to improve understanding of human memory, and develop better drugs to treat psychiatric disorders and memory-related disorders. People with Alzheimer's disease and other forms of dementia are likely to benefit. By understanding the ways in which amnesia-inducing drugs interact with the brain, researchers hope to better understand the ways in which neurotransmitters aid in the formation of memory. By stimulating rather than depressing these neurotransmitters, memory may improve.

Holmes et al. (2010) commented that the media misrepresented two recent studies as research on "erasing" traumatic memories, but showed the fear response associated with stressful memory could be greatly reduced whilst the factual memory of the trauma remained intact. Similarly, Brunet et al. (2008) found that the people with chronic posttraumatic stress disorder who were treated with propranolol for a single day had a reduced response to existing trauma while retaining memory of the trauma. In the process of remembering, the memory needs to be restored in the brain. By introducing an amnesia-inducing drug during this process, the memory can be disrupted. While the memory remains intact, the emotional reaction is damped, making the memory less overwhelming. Researchers believe this drug will help patients with post-traumatic stress disorder be able to better process the trauma without reliving the trauma emotionally. This has raised legal and ethical concerns should drugs be found to have altered the memory of traumatic events that occur in victims of crimes (e.g. murder attempt), and whether it is therapeutically desirable to do so.

== Non-medical drug-induced amnesia ==
Amnesia can result from a side-effect of prescription or non-prescription drugs. Both substance use and alcohol can cause both long-term and short-term memory loss, resulting in blackouts.

The most commonly used group of prescription drugs which can produce amnesia are benzodiazepines, especially if combined with alcohol, however, in limited quantities, triazolam (Halcion) is not associated with amnesia or memory impairment.

== In popular culture ==
- In the 1970 science fiction TV series UFO, amnesia drugs were given to anyone who had contact with SHADO operatives, or witnessed their covert activities.
- In Eternal Sunshine of the Spotless Mind (2004), Joel Barish (Jim Carrey) decides to forget his former lover Clementine Kruczynski (Kate Winslet) after she erases her memories of him.
- The characters in The Hangover (2009) deal with the aftermath of amnesia after taking roofies.
- An episode of Arrested Development called Forget-Me-Now discusses the use of drug-induced amnesia for those who have seen how magicians' tricks are performed.
- In the PC Game Amnesia: The Dark Descent (2010), the player character, Daniel, wakes up with amnesia in the terrifying Castle Brennenburg, and must discover the truth about his memories.
- In the book Allegiant (2013) a "memory serum" is used to wipe people's memories.
- The wiki-based collaborative fiction project, SCP Foundation, has referenced amnesia-inducing drugs in many of its articles since its conception, under the name "amnestics", usually as a means of ensuring secrecy from the public.
- In the teen fiction novel The Maze Runner, the teen characters wake up in a drug induced amnesia, which is one of the main factors that drive the plot.
- The role-playing game Disco Elysium (2019) opens with the player character awakening in a trashed hotel room with no memory of his identity after a self-destructive drinking binge.
- In the series 3 episode of Doctor Who, Gridlock, drugs that induce amnesia are sold in patch form with the name "forget."
- In the TV series Blindspot, the memory of the main character, Jane, was totally wiped using a drug called ZIP.
- In the 2018 Swedish film The Unthinkable, a chemical that induces memory loss, spread via rain, is used as a prelude to an invasion of Sweden.
- In Andy Weir's novel Project Hail Mary, main character Ryland Grace wakes up from a coma to drug-induced amnesia.

== In mythology ==
Nepenthe, literally named anti-sorrow, is a substance mentioned in the Odyssey given to Helen of Troy, said to originate from Egypt. Consumption causes sorrowful memories to be forgotten.
