= Zopiclone =

Hypnotic medication

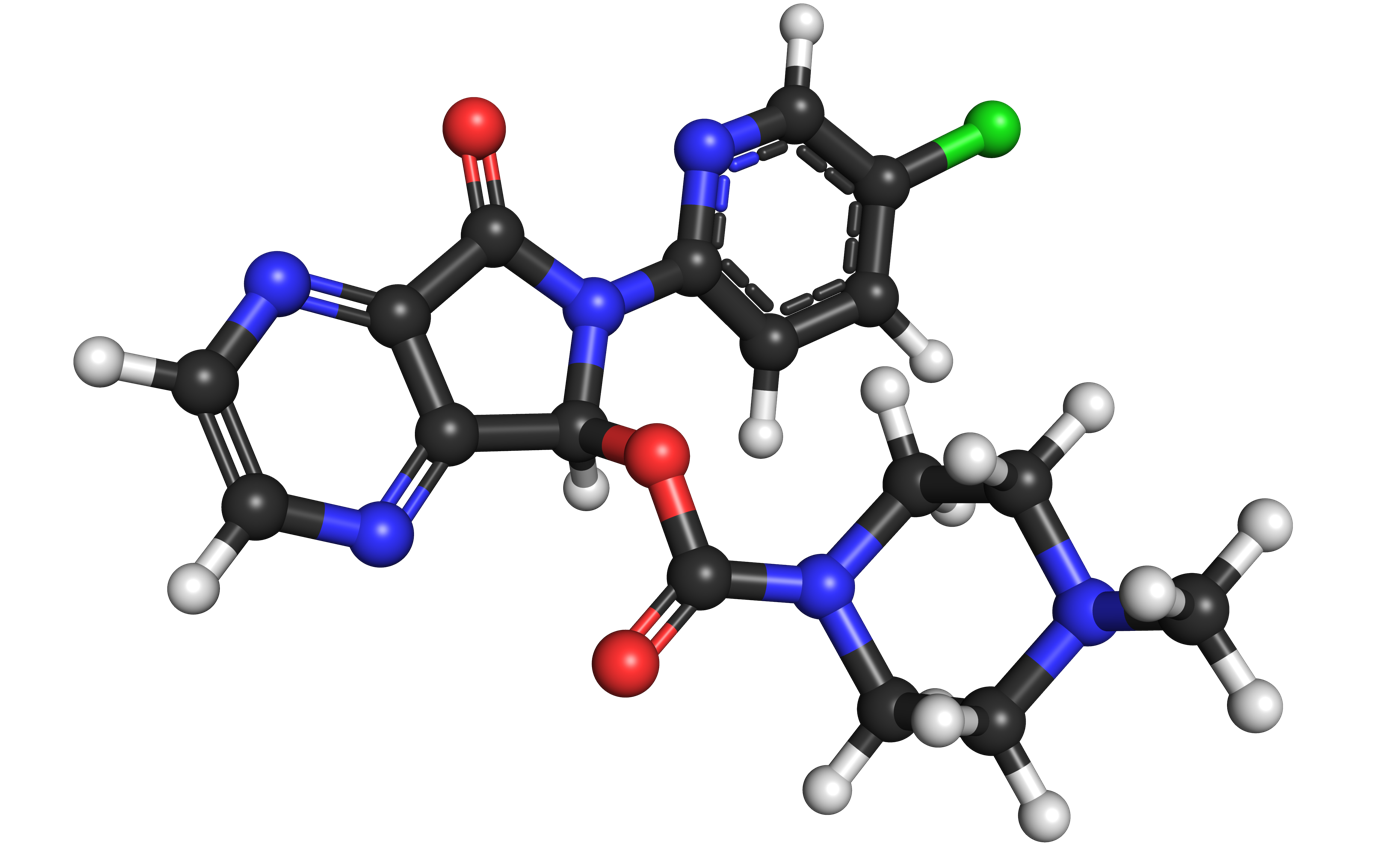
- Above: molecular structure of zopiclone Below: 3D representation of the (S)-zopiclone molecule

Clinical data
- Pronunciation: /ˌzoʊpɪkloʊn/ ZOH-pik-lohn
- Trade names: Imovane, Zimovane, Dopareel, others
- AHFS/Drugs.com: International Drug Names
- Pregnancy category: AU: C
- Dependence liability: High
- Addiction liability: High
- Routes of administration: By mouth
- ATC code: N05CF01 (WHO)

Legal status
- Legal status: AU: S4 (Prescription only); BR: Class B1 (Psychoactive drugs); CA: ℞-only; NZ: Class C5 -restricted; [3]: UK: Class C; US: Schedule IV; SE: Förteckning V In general: ℞ (Prescription only)

Pharmacokinetic data
- Bioavailability: 75–80%
- Protein binding: 52–59%
- Metabolism: Hepatic through CYP3A4 and CYP2E1
- Elimination half-life: ~5 hours (3.5–6.5 hours); ~7–9 hours for 65+ years old
- Excretion: Urine (80%)

Identifiers
- IUPAC name: (RS)-6-(5-chloropyridin-2-yl)-7-oxo-6,7-dihydro-5H-pyrrolo[3,4-b]pyrazin-5-yl 4-methylpiperazine-1-carboxylate
- CAS Number: 43200-80-2
- PubChem CID: 5735
- IUPHAR/BPS: 7430
- DrugBank: DB01198
- ChemSpider: 5533
- UNII: 03A5ORL08Q
- KEGG: D01372
- ChEBI: CHEBI:32315
- ChEMBL: ChEMBL135400
- PDB ligand: ZPC (PDBe, RCSB PDB)
- CompTox Dashboard (EPA): DTXSID4041155
- ECHA InfoCard: 100.051.018

Chemical and physical data
- Formula: C_{17}H_{17}ClN_{6}O_{3}
- Molar mass: 388.81 g·mol^{−1}
- 3D model (JSmol): Interactive image
- SMILES: O=C(OC3c1nccnc1C(=O)N3c2ncc(Cl)cc2)N4CCN(C)CC4
- InChI: InChI=1S/C17H17ClN6O3/c1-22-6-8-23(9-7-22)17(26)27-16-14-13(19-4-5-20-14)15(25)24(16)12-3-2-11(18)10-21-12/h2-5,10,16H,6-9H2,1H3; Key:GBBSUAFBMRNDJC-UHFFFAOYSA-N

Zopiclone, sold under the brand name Imovane among others, is a benzodiazepine-like drug (Z-drug) used as a pharmaceutical treatment for insomnia. While molecularly distinct from benzodiazepine drugs, zopiclone's mechanism of action is similar: it increases the transmission of the neurotransmitter gamma-aminobutyric acid (GABA) in the central nervous system, via positive allosteric modulation at GABA_{A} neurons. Zopiclone is considered a sedative and CNS depressant. Zopiclone and other benzodiazepine-like drugs like zaleplon and zolpidem are addictive. Within days to weeks, the body can become accustomed to the effects of zopiclone. When the dose is then reduced or the drug is abruptly stopped, withdrawal symptoms similar to those of benzodiazepine withdrawal may result.

Benzodiazepine-like drugs decrease sleep latency by 10 to 20 minutes. However, no benzodiazepine-like drug has shown clinically significant increase in total sleep time. Zopiclone is recommended only to be taken at the lowest effective dose, with a duration of 2–3 weeks, for short-term insomnia. Use of zopiclone more than 4 weeks is not recommended. It is dangerous to take with benzodiazepines, sedatives, alcohol or other drugs affecting the central nervous system.

In the United States, zopiclone is not commercially available, although its active stereoisomer, eszopiclone, is. Zopiclone is a controlled substance in the United States, Japan, Brazil, New Zealand and some European countries, and may be illegal to possess without a prescription.

== Medical uses ==
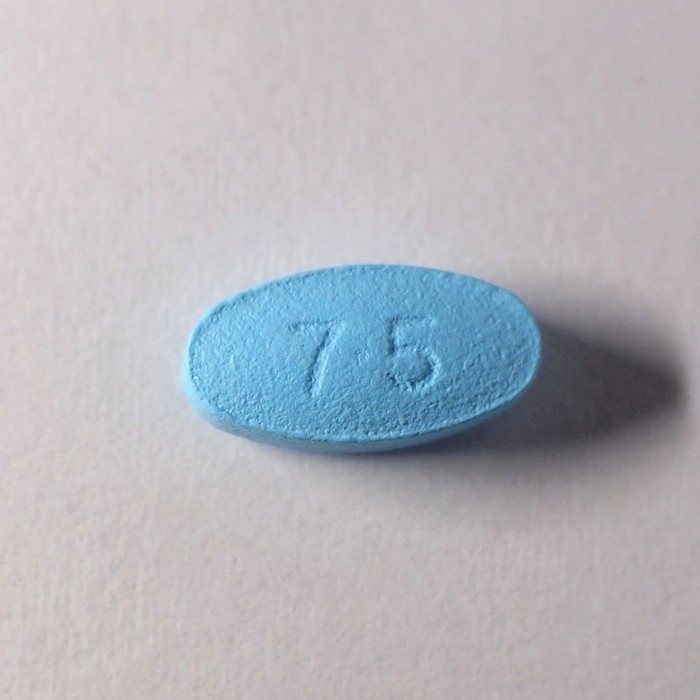
A 7.5 mg zopiclone tablet.

Zopiclone is used for the short-term treatment of insomnia where difficulty with sleep initiation or sleep maintenance are prominent symptoms. Long-term use is not recommended, as tolerance, dependence, and addiction can occur. Benzodiazepine-like drugs decrease sleep latency by 10 to 20 minutes. However, no benzodiazepine-like drug has shown clinically significant increase in total sleep time which is defined as at least 30 minutes. Tolerance develops within days to weeks. Zopiclone is recommended to be taken at the lowest effective dose, with a duration of 2–3 weeks for short-term insomnia. Use of zopiclone more than 4 weeks is not recommended. Caution must be taken when the compound is used in conjunction with benzodiazepines, sedatives or other drugs affecting the central nervous system. One low-quality study found that zopiclone is ineffective in improving sleep quality or increasing sleep time in shift workers.

Cognitive behavioral therapy has been found to be superior to zopiclone in the treatment of insomnia and has been found to have lasting effects on sleep quality for at least a year after therapy.

A 2004 meta-analysis of randomised controlled clinical trials that compared benzodiazepines to zopiclone or other Z drugs such as zolpidem and zaleplon has found few clear and consistent differences between zopiclone and the benzodiazepines in sleep onset latency, total sleep duration, number of awakenings, quality of sleep, adverse events, tolerance, rebound insomnia, and daytime alertness.

=== Elderly ===
Zopiclone, similar to other benzodiazepines and nonbenzodiazepine hypnotic drugs, causes impairments in body balance and standing steadiness in individuals who wake up at night or the next morning. Falls and hip fractures are frequently reported. The combination with alcohol consumption increases these impairments. Partial, but incomplete tolerance develops to these impairments. Zopiclone increases postural sway and increases the number of falls in older people, as well as cognitive side effects. Falls are a significant cause of death in older people.

An extensive review of the medical literature regarding the management of insomnia and the elderly found that considerable evidence of the effectiveness and lasting benefits of nondrug treatments for insomnia exist. Compared with the benzodiazepines, the nonbenzodiazepine sedative-hypnotics, such as zopiclone, offer few if any advantages in efficacy or tolerability in elderly persons. Newer agents such as the melatonin receptor agonists may be more suitable and effective for the management of chronic insomnia in elderly people. Long-term use of sedative-hypnotics for insomnia lacks an evidence base and is discouraged for reasons that include concerns about such potential adverse drug effects as cognitive impairment (anterograde amnesia), daytime sedation, motor incoordination, and increased risk of motor vehicle accidents and falls. In addition, the effectiveness and safety of long-term use of nonbenzodiazepine hypnotic drugs remains to be determined.

=== Liver disease ===
Patients with liver disease eliminate zopiclone much more slowly than normal patients and in addition experience exaggerated pharmacological effects of the drug.

== Adverse reactions ==
Sleeping pills, including zopiclone, have been associated with an increased risk of death. The British National Formulary states adverse reactions as follows: "taste disturbance (some report a metallic taste); less commonly nausea, vomiting, dizziness, drowsiness, dry mouth, headache; rarely amnesia, confusion, depression, hallucinations, nightmares; very rarely light-headedness, incoordination, paradoxical effects [...] and sleep-walking also reported".

Long-term use of Z-drugs, including zopiclone, has been associated with dependence, withdrawal symptoms, and cognitive impairment.

== Contraindications ==
Zopiclone causes impaired driving skills similar to those of benzodiazepines. Long-term users of hypnotic drugs for sleep disorders develop only partial tolerance to adverse effects on driving, with users of hypnotic drugs even after one year of use still showing an increased motor vehicle accident rate. Patients who drive motor vehicles should not take zopiclone as there is a significantly increased risk of accidents in zopiclone users. Zopiclone induces impairment of psychomotor function. Driving or operating machinery should be avoided after taking zopiclone as effects can carry over to the next day, including impaired hand-eye coordination.

A double-blind study on the effect on performance of several hypnotic medications, relevant to military personnel who may have to be awakened to carry out duties, found that drugs listed in increasing order of performance impact duration were melatonin (with no impact), zaleplon, temazepam, and zopiclone. The effects on serial reaction time (SRT), logical reasoning (LRT), serial subtraction (SST), and multitask (MT) were measured. For zaleplon (10 mg), zopiclone (7.5 mg) and temazepam (15 mg) respectively the times to recover normal performance for SRT were 3.25, 6.25, and 5.25 hours; for LRT 3.25, >6.25, and 4.25 hours; for SST 2.25, >6.25, and 4.25 hours; and for MT 2.25, 4.25, and 3.25 hours. The study did not consider the effectiveness of the drugs on sleep.

It causes similar alterations on EEG readings and sleep architecture as benzodiazepines and causes disturbances in sleep architecture on withdrawal as part of its rebound effect. Zopiclone reduces both delta waves (slow-wave sleep) and the number of high-amplitude delta waves whilst increasing low-amplitude waves. Zopiclone reduces the total amount of time spent in REM sleep as well as delaying its onset. In EEG studies, zopiclone significantly increases the energy of the beta frequency band, increasing stage 2. Zopiclone is less selective to the α1 site and has higher affinity to the α2 site than zaleplon. Zopiclone is therefore very similar pharmacologically to benzodiazepines.

== Overdose ==
Zopiclone is sometimes used as a method of suicide. It has a similar fatality index to that of benzodiazepine drugs, apart from temazepam, which is particularly toxic in overdose. Deaths have occurred from zopiclone overdose, alone or in combination with other drugs. Overdose of zopiclone may present with excessive sedation and depressed respiratory function that may progress to coma and possibly death. Zopiclone combined with alcohol, opiates, or other central nervous system depressants may be even more likely to lead to fatal overdoses. Zopiclone overdosage can be treated with the GABA_{A} receptor benzodiazepine site antagonist flumazenil, which displaces zopiclone from its binding site, thereby rapidly reversing its effects. Serious effects on the heart may also occur from a zopiclone overdose when combined with piperazine. Zopiclone is one of the most common drugs in drug poisoning suicides in elderly. When taken alone, it usually is not fatal, but when mixed with alcohol or other drugs such as opioids, or in patients with respiratory, or hepatic disorders, the risk of a serious and fatal overdose increases.

== Interactions ==
Zopiclone also interacts with trimipramine and caffeine.

Alcohol has an additive effect when combined with zopiclone, enhancing the adverse effects including the overdose potential of zopiclone significantly. Due to these risks and the increased risk for dependence, alcohol should be avoided when using zopiclone.

Erythromycin appears to increase the absorption rate of zopiclone and prolong its elimination half-life, leading to increased plasma levels and more pronounced effects. Itraconazole has a similar effect on zopiclone pharmacokinetics as erythromycin. The elderly may be particularly sensitive to the erythromycin and itraconazole drug interaction with zopiclone. Temporary dosage reduction during combined therapy may be required, especially in the elderly. Rifampicin causes a very notable reduction in half-life of zopiclone and peak plasma levels, which results in a large reduction in the hypnotic effect of zopiclone. Phenytoin and carbamazepine may also provoke similar interactions. Ketoconazole and sulfaphenazole interfere with the metabolism of zopiclone. Nefazodone impairs the metabolism of zopiclone leading to increased zopiclone levels and marked next-day sedation.

== Pharmacology ==
The therapeutic pharmacological properties of zopiclone include hypnotic, anxiolytic, anticonvulsant, and myorelaxant properties. Zopiclone and benzodiazepines bind to the same sites on GABA_{A} receptors, causing an enhancement of the actions of GABA to produce the therapeutic and adverse effects of zopiclone. The metabolite of zopiclone desmethylzopiclone is also pharmacologically active, although it has predominately anxiolytic properties. One study found some slight selectivity for zopiclone on α1 and α5 subunits, although it is regarded as being unselective in its binding to GABA_{A} receptors containing α1, α2, α3, and α5 subunits. Desmethylzopiclone has been found to have partial agonist properties, unlike the parent drug zopiclone, which is a full agonist. The mechanism of action of zopiclone is similar to benzodiazepines, with similar effects on locomotor activity and on dopamine and serotonin turnover.

Zopiclone is in the cyclopyrrolone family of drugs. Other cyclopyrrolone drugs include suriclone. Zopiclone, although molecularly different from benzodiazepines, shares an almost identical pharmacological profile as benzodiazepines, including anxiolytic properties. Its mechanism of action is by binding to the benzodiazepine site and acting as a full agonist, which in turn positively modulates benzodiazepine-sensitive GABA_{A} receptors and enhances GABA binding at the GABA_{A} receptors to produce zopiclone's pharmacological properties. In addition to zopiclone's benzodiazepine pharmacological properties, it also has some barbiturate-like properties.

=== Pharmacokinetics ===
Two major zopiclone metabolites.

After oral administration, zopiclone is rapidly absorbed, with a bioavailability around 75–80%. Time to peak plasma concentration is 1–2 hours. A high-fat meal preceding zopiclone administration does not change absorption (as measured by AUC), but reduces peak plasma levels and delays its occurrence, thus may delay the onset of therapeutic effects.

The plasma protein-binding of zopiclone has been reported to be weak, between 45 and 80% (mean 52–59%). It is rapidly and widely distributed to body tissues, including the brain, and is excreted in urine, saliva, and breast milk. Zopiclone is partly extensively metabolized in the liver to form an inactive N-demethylated derivative (N-desmethylzopiclone) and an active zopiclone-N-oxide. Hepatic enzymes playing the most significant role in zopiclone metabolism are CYP3A4 and CYP2E1. In addition, about 50% of the administered dose is decarboxylated and excreted via the lungs. In urine, the N-demethyl and N-oxide metabolites account for 30% of the initial dose. Between 7 and 10% of zopiclone is recovered from the urine, indicating extensive metabolism of the drug before excretion. The terminal elimination half-life of zopiclone ranges from 3.5 to 6.5 hours (5 hours on average).

The pharmacokinetics of zopiclone in humans are stereoselective. After oral administration of the racemic mixture, C_{max} (time to maximum plasma concentration), area under the plasma time-concentration curve (AUC) and terminal elimination half-life values are higher for the dextrorotatory enantiomers, owing to the slower total clearance and smaller volume of distribution (corrected by the bioavailability), compared with the levorotatory enantiomer. In urine, the concentrations of the dextrorotatory enantiomers of the N-demethyl and N-oxide metabolites are higher than those of the respective antipodes.

The pharmacokinetics of zopiclone are altered by aging and are influenced by renal and hepatic functions. In severe chronic kidney failure, the area under the curve value for zopiclone was larger and the half-life associated with the elimination rate constant longer, but these changes were not considered to be clinically significant. Sex and race have not been found to interact with pharmacokinetics of zopiclone.

== Chemistry ==
The melting point of zopiclone is 178 °C. Zopiclone's solubility in water, at room temperature (25 °C) are 0.151 mg/mL. The logP value of zopiclone is 0.8.

=== Detection in biological fluids ===
Zopiclone may be measured in blood, plasma, or urine by chromatographic methods. Plasma concentrations are typically less than 100 μg/L during therapeutic use, but frequently exceed 100 μg/L in automotive vehicle operators arrested for impaired driving ability and may exceed 1000 μg/L in acutely poisoned patients. Post mortem blood concentrations are usually in a range of 400 to 3900 μg/L in victims of fatal acute overdose.

== History ==
Zopiclone was developed and first introduced in 1986 by Rhône-Poulenc S.A., now part of Sanofi, the main worldwide manufacturer. Initially, it was promoted as an improvement on benzodiazepines, which has since been disproven. On April 4, 2005, the U.S. Drug Enforcement Administration listed zopiclone under schedule IV, due to evidence that the drug has addictive properties similar to benzodiazepines.

Zopiclone, as traditionally sold worldwide, is a racemic mixture of two stereoisomers, only one of which is active. In 2005, the pharmaceutical company Sepracor of Marlborough, Massachusetts, began marketing the active stereoisomer eszopiclone under the name Lunesta in the United States. This had the consequence of placing what is a generic drug in most of the world under patent control in the United States. Generic forms of Lunesta have since become available in the United States. Zopiclone is currently available off-patent in a number of European countries, Brazil, Canada, Hong Kong, and New Zealand. The eszopiclone/zopiclone difference is in the dosage—the strongest eszopiclone dosage contains 3 mg of the therapeutic stereoisomer, whereas the highest zopiclone dosage (10 mg) contains 5 mg of the active stereoisomer.

== Society and culture ==
=== Recreational use ===
Zopiclone has the potential for non-medical use, dosage escalation, and drug dependence. It is taken orally and sometimes intravenously when used non-medically, and often combined with alcohol to achieve euphoria. Patients abusing the drug are also at risk of dependence. Withdrawal symptoms can be seen after long-term use of normal doses even after a gradual reduction regimen. The Compendium of Pharmaceuticals and Specialties recommends zopiclone prescriptions not exceed 7 to 10 days, owing to concerns of addiction, tolerance, and physical dependence. Two types of drug misuse can occur: either recreational misuse, wherein the drug is taken to achieve a high, or when the drug is continued long-term against medical advice. Zopiclone may be more addictive than benzodiazepines. Those with a history of substance misuse or mental health disorders may be at an increased risk of high-dose zopiclone misuse. High-dose misuse of zopiclone and increasing popularity amongst people who use substances who have been prescribed with zopiclone was shown in the 1990s. The symptoms of zopiclone addiction can include depression, dysphoria, hopelessness, slow thoughts, social isolation, worrying, sexual anhedonia, and nervousness.

Zopiclone and other sedative hypnotic drugs are detected frequently in cases of people suspected of driving under the influence of drugs. Other sedating drugs, including benzodiazepines and zolpidem, are also found in high numbers of suspected drugged drivers. Many drivers have blood levels far exceeding the therapeutic dose range and often in combination with alcohol, illegal, or addictive prescription drugs, suggesting a high degree of potential for non-medical use of benzodiazepines, zolpidem, and zopiclone. Zopiclone, which at prescribed doses causes moderate impairment the next day, has been estimated to increase the risk of vehicle accidents by 50%, causing an increase of 503 excess accidents per 100,000 persons. Zaleplon or other nonimpairing sleep aids were recommended be used instead of zopiclone to reduce traffic accidents. Zopiclone, as with other hypnotic drugs, is sometimes used to carry out criminal acts such as sexual assaults.

Zopiclone has crosstolerance with barbiturates and is able to suppress barbiturate withdrawal symptoms. It is frequently self-administered intravenously in studies on monkeys, suggesting a high risk of addictive potential.

Zopiclone is in the top ten medications obtained using a false prescription in France.
