= Ticabesone =

Chemical compound

Clinical data
- Other names: 6α,9α-Difluoro-11β,17α-dihydroxy-16α-methyl-21-methyl-21-thiapregna-1,4-dien-3,20-dione; S-Methyl 6α,9α-difluoro-11β,17α-dihydroxy-16α-methyl-3-oxoandrosta-1,4-diene-17β-carbothioate
- Drug class: Corticosteroid; Glucocorticoid

Identifiers
- IUPAC name: S-Methyl (6S,8S,9R,10S,11S,13S,14S,16R,17R)-6,9-Difluoro-11,17-dihydroxy-10,13,16-trimethyl-3-oxo-6,7,8,11,12,14,15,16-octahydrocyclopenta[a]phenanthrene-17-carbothioate
- CAS Number: 74131-77-4
- PubChem CID: 23254171
- UNII: 3805C1ABKY
- CompTox Dashboard (EPA): DTXSID00225094

Chemical and physical data
- Formula: C_{22}H_{28}F_{2}O_{4}S
- Molar mass: 426.52 g·mol^{−1}
- 3D model (JSmol): Interactive image
- SMILES: C[C@@H]1C[C@H]2[C@@H]3C[C@@H](C4=CC(=O)C=C[C@@]4([C@]3([C@H](C[C@@]2([C@]1(C(=O)SC)O)C)O)F)C)F
- InChI: InChI=1S/C22H28F2O4S/c1-11-7-13-14-9-16(23)15-8-12(25)5-6-19(15,2)21(14,24)17(26)10-20(13,3)22(11,28)18(27)29-4/h5-6,8,11,13-14,16-17,26,28H,7,9-10H2,1-4H3/t11-,13+,14+,16+,17+,19+,20+,21+,22+/m1/s1; Key:TYVHQHCXWZVELU-GQKYHHCASA-N

Ticabesone is a synthetic glucocorticoid corticosteroid which was never marketed.
