= Timobesone =

Chemical compound

Clinical data
- Other names: 9α-Fluoro-11β,17α-dihydroxy-16α-methyl-21-methyl-21-thiapregna-1,4-dien-3,20-dione; S-Methyl 9α-fluoro-11β,17α-dihydroxy-16β-methyl-3-oxoandrosta-1,4-diene-17β-carbothioate;
- Drug class: Corticosteroid; Glucocorticoid

Identifiers
- IUPAC name: S-Methyl (8S,9R,10S,11S,13S,14S,16S,17R)-9-Fluoro-11,17-dihydroxy-10,13,16-trimethyl-3-oxo-6,7,8,11,12,14,15,16-octahydrocyclopenta[a]phenanthrene-17-carbothioate
- CAS Number: 87116-72-1
- PubChem CID: 15986965
- UNII: 97TVB2O56G
- CompTox Dashboard (EPA): DTXSID80236143

Chemical and physical data
- Formula: C_{22}H_{29}FO_{4}S
- Molar mass: 408.53 g·mol^{−1}
- 3D model (JSmol): Interactive image
- SMILES: C[C@H]1C[C@H]2[C@@H]3CCC4=CC(=O)C=C[C@@]4([C@]3([C@H](C[C@@]2([C@]1(C(=O)SC)O)C)O)F)C
- InChI: InChI=1S/C22H29FO4S/c1-12-9-16-15-6-5-13-10-14(24)7-8-19(13,2)21(15,23)17(25)11-20(16,3)22(12,27)18(26)28-4/h7-8,10,12,15-17,25,27H,5-6,9,11H2,1-4H3/t12-,15-,16-,17-,19-,20-,21-,22-/m0/s1; Key:LNGNTCFORRWFSF-DVTGEIKXSA-N

Timobesone is a synthetic glucocorticoid corticosteroid which was never marketed.
