= Tabilautide =

Names
- IUPAC name (2S,6S)-6-Amino-6-carbamoyl-2-[(4R)-4-carboxy-4-[(2R)-2-dodecanamidopropanamido]butanamido]hexanoic acid

Identifiers
CAS Number	(unspecified stereochemistry): 78088-46-7
3D model (JSmol)	Interactive image
ChEMBL	ChEMBL3989637
ChemSpider	2342790
PubChem CID	3086083
UNII	EZ61NB05TG
CompTox Dashboard (EPA)	DTXSID00228722
- InChI: InChI=1S/C27H49N5O8/c1-3-4-5-6-7-8-9-10-11-15-22(33)30-18(2)25(36)32-21(27(39)40)16-17-23(34)31-20(26(37)38)14-12-13-19(28)24(29)35/h18-21H,3-17,28H2,1-2H3,(H2,29,35)(H,30,33)(H,31,34)(H,32,36)(H,37,38)(H,39,40)/t18-,19-,20-,21+/m0/s1 Key: TUNXCNXMSJZNPO-XSDIEEQYSA-N
- SMILES: CCCCCCCCCCCC(=O)N[C@H](C)C(=O)N[C@H](CCC(=O)N[C@@H](CCC[C@H](N)C(N)=O)C(O)=O)C(O)=O

Properties
Chemical formula	C_{27}H_{49}N_{5}O_{8}
Molar mass	571.716 g·mol^{−1}
- Except where otherwise noted, data are given for materials in their standard state (at 25 °C [77 °F], 100 kPa). Infobox references

Tabilautide is an immunological agent. It was studied as a potential drug for the treatment of cancer, but development for this purpose has been discontinued.
