= C11H14N2S =

The molecular formula C_{11}H_{14}N_{2}S (molar mass: 206.307 g/mol, exact mass: 206.0878 u) may refer to:

- Pyrantel
- Tiquinamide
