= Tiquinamide =

Names
- Preferred IUPAC name 3-Methyl-5,6,7,8-tetrahydroquinoline-8-carbothioamide

Identifiers
CAS Number	53400-67-2
3D model (JSmol)	Interactive image
ChemSpider	2274315
PubChem CID	3003921
UNII	51O951X8V9
CompTox Dashboard (EPA)	DTXSID60866321
- InChI: InChI=1S/C11H14N2S/c1-7-5-8-3-2-4-9(11(12)14)10(8)13-6-7/h5-6,9H,2-4H2,1H3,(H2,12,14) Key: AIMIAJHGOMWBQG-UHFFFAOYSA-N
- SMILES: Cc1cc2c(nc1)C(CCC2)C(=S)N

Properties
Chemical formula	C_{11}H_{14}N_{2}S
Molar mass	206.31 g·mol^{−1}
- Except where otherwise noted, data are given for materials in their standard state (at 25 °C [77 °F], 100 kPa). Infobox references

Tiquinamide is a gastric acid synthesis inhibitor.
