= Thiotetrabarbital =

Chemical compound

Clinical data
- Other names: JL-1014
- ATC code: None

Identifiers
- IUPAC name: 5-ethyl-5-(3-hexanyl)-2-thioxodihydro-4,6(1H,5H)-pyrimidinedione
- CAS Number: 467-38-9
- PubChem CID: 3083570
- ChemSpider: 2340756
- UNII: 1P93TO196Z
- CompTox Dashboard (EPA): DTXSID50861961

Chemical and physical data
- Formula: C_{12}H_{20}N_{2}O_{2}S
- Molar mass: 256.36 g·mol^{−1}
- 3D model (JSmol): Interactive image
- SMILES: O=C1NC(=S)NC(=O)C1(C(CC)CCC)CC
- InChI: InChI=1S/C12H20N2O2S/c1-4-7-8(5-2)12(6-3)9(15)13-11(17)14-10(12)16/h8H,4-7H2,1-3H3,(H2,13,14,15,16,17); Key:SSWATJQIZBUQQZ-UHFFFAOYSA-N

Thiotetrabarbital (INN; Thionarcex) is a drug which is a short-acting barbiturate derivative that is used as an anesthetic. It has been used in veterinary medicine.

== See also ==
- Barbiturate
