= List of drugs: As–Az =

This multi-page article lists pharmaceutical drugs alphabetically by name. Many drugs have more than one name and, therefore, the same drug may be listed more than once. Brand names and generic names are differentiated by capitalizing brand names.

See also the list of the top 100 bestselling branded drugs, ranked by sales.

Abbreviations are used in the list as follows:

- INN = International nonproprietary name
- BAN = British Approved Name
- USAN = United States Adopted Name
- Two-letter codes for countries

Lists of drugs
1–9 | A | B | C | D | E | F | G | H | I | J | K | L | M | N | O | P | Q | R | S | T | U | V | W | X | Y | Z

Aa–Ab | Ac | Ad–Ak | Al | Am | An–Ap | Aq–Ar | As–Az

== as ==
- Asacol
- Asaphen
- Asbron
- Asceniv
- ascorbic acid (INN)
- Ascorbicap
- Ascriptin
- Asellacrin 10
- aselizumab (INN)
- asenapine (INN)
- Asendin
- aseripide (INN)
- Aservo Equihaler
- asfotase alfa (INN)
- asimadoline (INN)
- Asmalix, also known as theophylline.
- asobamast (INN)
- asocainol (INN)
- asoprisnil (USAN)
- asparaginase (INN)
- aspartame (INN)
- aspartic acid (INN)
- aspartocin (INN)
- Aspercin
- Aspergum
- aspirin
- aspoxicillin (INN)
- Astelin
- astemizole (INN)
- Astramorph PF
- astromicin (INN)
- astuprotimut-R (USAN)
- asunaprevir (USAN, INN)
- asundexian (USAN, INN)

== at ==
=== ata-atn ===
- Atabrine (Abbott)
- Atacand
- atacicept (USAN, INN)
- atacicept-vymj
- ataciguat (INN)
- atagabalin (USAN, INN)
- ataluren (USAN, INN)
- atamestane (INN)
- ataprost (INN)
- Atapryl
- Atarax
- Atasol
- atazanavir (USAN)
- Atebrioz
- atecegatran fexenetil (INN)
- atecegatran (INN)
- Atehexal
- atenolol (INN)
- atevirdine (INN)
- atexakin alfa (INN)
- ATG
- Atgam
- Athrombin-K
- Athrombin
- atibeprone (INN)
- atidarsagene autotemcel (USAN, INN)
- atiglifozin (INN)
- atilmotin (USAN)
- atinumab (INN)
- atinvicitinib (INN)
- atiratecan (INN)
- atipamezole (INN)
- atiprimod (INN)
- atiprosin (INN)
- Ativan
- atizoram (INN)
- atliprofen (INN)
- Atnaa

=== ato-atz ===
- atolide (INN)
- Atolone Oral
- atomoxetine (USAN)
- atopaxar (USAN, INN)
- atorolimumab (INN)
- Atorvaliq
- atorvastatin (INN)
- atosiban (INN)
- atovaquone (INN)
- Atozine Oral
- atracurium besilate (INN)
- atrasentan (INN)
- atreleuton (INN)
- atriciguat (INN)
- Atridox
- atrimustine (INN)
- atrinositol (INN)
- Atrohist Plus
- atromepine (INN)
- Atromid-S
- Atropen
- atropine
- atropine methonitrate (INN)
- atropine oxide (INN)
- Atrosept
- Atrovent
- Attenuvax
- Attrogy
- Attruby
- Atzumi

== au ==
- Aucatzyl
- Augmentin
- Augtyro
- Aujemflu
- Aumseqa
- Auralgan
- auranofin (INN)
- Aureomycin
- Aurexis
- Aurodex
- Aurolate
- aurothioglycanide (INN)
- Auroto
- Aususvar
- Autoplex T

== av ==
- avagacestat (USAN, INN)
- Avagard
- Avage
- Avalide
- Avance
- Avmapki
- Avmapki Fakzynja
- avanafil (USAN)
- Avandamet
- Avandia
- Avapro
- AVAR
- avasimibe (INN)
- Avastin
- Avaxim
- AVC
- Aveeno Cleansing Bar
- Avelox
- Aventyl
- Avgemsi
- Aviane
- avibactam (INN)
- avicatonin (INN)
- avilamycin (INN)
- Avinza
- aviptadil (INN)
- aviscumine (INN)
- Avita
- Avitene
- avitriptan (INN)
- avizafone (INN)
- Avlayah
- Avlosulfon
- avobenzone (INN)
- Avodart
- Avonex
- avoparcin (INN)
- avorelin (INN)
- avosentan (INN)
- avotermin (INN)
- avridine (INN)
- Avtozma
- Avzivi

== aw-ay ==
- Awiqli
- Awiqli FlexTouch
- axamozide (INN)
- axatilimab (INN)
- Axberi
- Axberi HP
- Axert
- axicabtagene ciloleucel (USAN, INN)
- Axid
- axitinib (USAN)
- Axocet
- axomadol (USAN)
- Axotal
- Aybintio
- Aygestin
- Ayradia

== az ==
=== aza ===
==== azab-azaq ====
- azabon (INN)
- azabuperone (INN)
- azacitidine (INN)
- azaclorzine (INN)
- azaconazole (INN)
- azacosterol (INN)
- Azactam
- azacyclonol (INN)
- azaftozine (INN)
- Azahexal (Hexal Australia) [Au], also known as azathioprine.
- azalanstat (INN)
- azalomycin (INN)
- azaloxan (INN)
- azamethonium bromide (INN)
- azamulin (INN)
- azanator (INN)
- azanidazole (INN)
- azaperone (INN)
- azaprocin (INN)
- azapropazone (INN)
- azaquinzole (INN)

==== azar-azat ====
- azaribine (INN)
- Azasan
- azaserine (INN)
- azasetron (INN)
- azaspirium chloride (INN)
- azastene (INN)
- azatadine (INN)
- azatepa (INN)
- azathioprine (INN)

=== azd-azm ===
- Azdone
- azelaic acid (INN)
- azelastine (INN)
- Azelex
- azelnidipine (INN)
- azepexole (INN)
- azepindole (INN)
- azetirelin (INN)
- azficel-T (USAN)
- azidamfenicol (INN)
- azidocillin (INN)
- azilsartan (INN)
- azilsartan kamedoxomil (USAN)
- azilsartan medoxomil (USAN)
- azimexon (INN)
- azimilide (INN)
- azintamide (INN)
- azipramine (INN)
- azithromycin (INN)
- Azlin
- azlocillin (INN)
- Azmacort

=== azo-azu ===
- Azo Gantanol
- Azo Gantrisin
- Azolid
- azolimine (INN)
- Azopt
- azosemide (INN)
- azotomycin (INN)
- azoximer bromide (INN)
- aztreonam (INN)
- Azulfidine
- azumolene (INN)
