= C5H6S =

The molecular formula C_{5}H_{6}S may refer to:

- Methylthiophenes
  - 2-Methylthiophene, an organosulfur compound that can be produced by Wolff-Kishner reduction of thiophene-2-carboxaldehyde
  - 3-Methylthiophene, an organosulfur that can be produced by sulfidation of 2-methylsuccinate
- Thiopyran, a heterocyclic compound
