= C17H18N2O3S =

The molecular formula C_{17}H_{18}N_{2}O_{3}S (molar mass: 330.40 g/mol, exact mass: 330.1038 u) may refer to:

- Atibeprone
- SB-205384
