= Laviv =

Laviv may refer to:

== People ==
- Yigal Laviv, Israeli journalist who broke the Yadlin affair Israeli political corruption scandal
- Shmuel Laviv-Lubin (1923–2012), Israeli Olympic sport shooter
- Laviv-Hussein Abu-Rochan (1911-1989), Druze Israeli politician

== Other uses ==
- Laviv, a brand name for the medication Azficel-T

== See also ==
- LAV IV (LAV 4), a variant of the General Motors LAV (Light Armoured Vehicle)
