= Methylthiophene =

Methylthiophene may refer to:

- 2-Methylthiophene
- 3-Methylthiophene
