= C12H16N2S =

The molecular formula C_{12}H_{16}N_{2}S (molar mass: 220.33 g/mol, exact mass: 220.1034 u) may refer to:

- Morantel
- Xylazine
