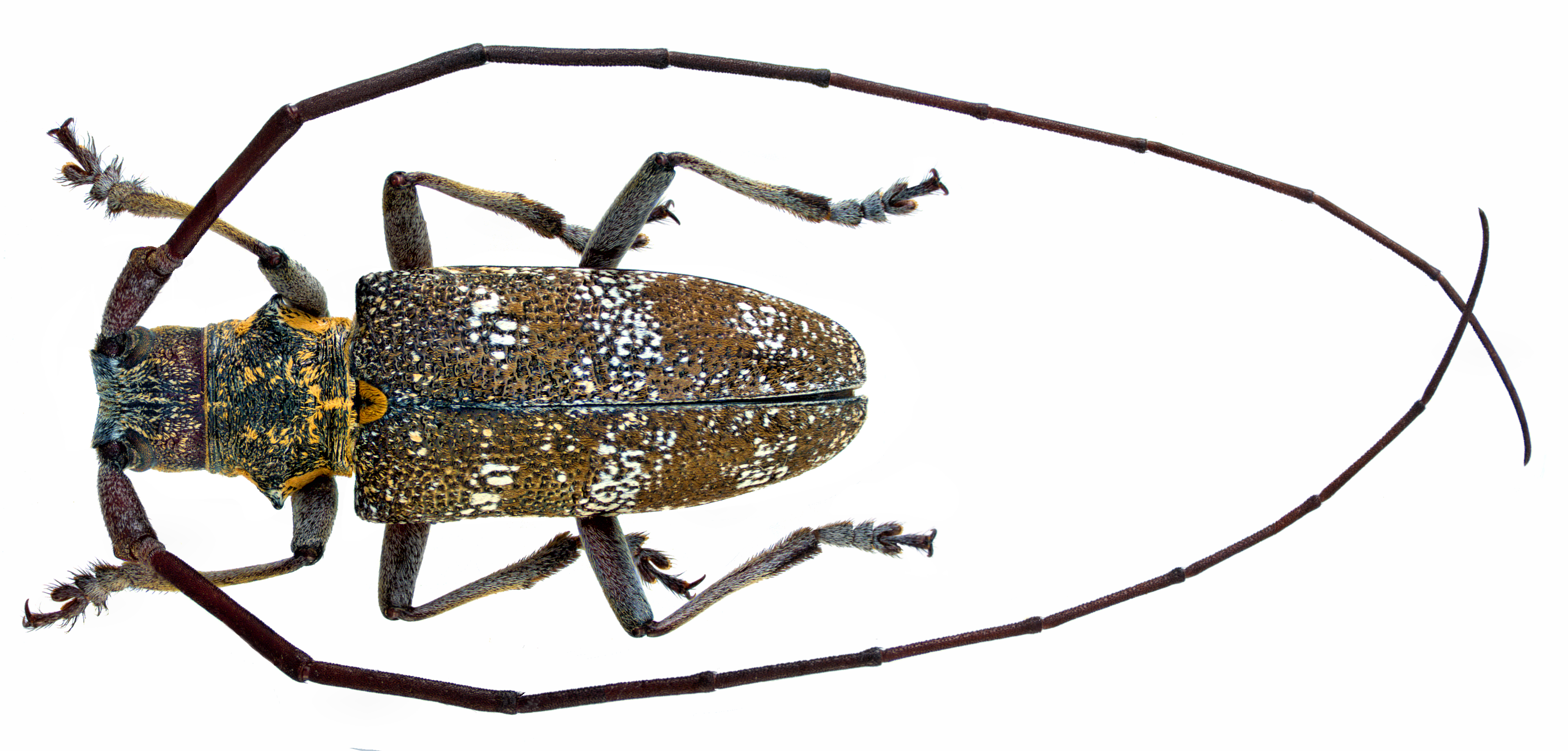

Scientific classification
- Kingdom: Animalia
- Phylum: Arthropoda
- Clade: Pancrustacea
- Class: Insecta
- Order: Coleoptera
- Suborder: Polyphaga
- Infraorder: Cucujiformia
- Family: Cerambycidae
- Genus: Monochamus
- Species: M. galloprovincialis

Binomial name
- Monochamus galloprovincialis (Olivier, 1795)

Synonyms
- Cerambyx galloprovincialis Olivier, 1795; Lamia sutor (Linnaeus) Rossi, 1790

= Monochamus galloprovincialis =

Species of beetle

Monochamus galloprovincialis, the pine sawyer beetle, also referred to as the black pine sawyer beetle, is a species of beetle in the family Cerambycidae. It was described by Olivier in 1795, originally under the genus Cerambyx. It has a wide distribution, occurring naturally throughout Europe and the Caucasus. It has also been introduced into the Canary Islands. It serves as a vector for the parasitic nematode species Bursaphelenchus xylophilus, and also acts as a host to the parasitoid wasp species Dolichomitus tuberculatus.

Adult beetles are strong fliers, and in flight mill experiments were, on average, able to fly 16 km over the lifetime of the beetle. The adult male produces an aggregation pheromone to attract females.

== Subspecies ==
- Monochamus galloprovincialis cinerascens Motschulsky, 1860
- Monochamus galloprovincialis galloprovincialis (Olivier, 1795)
- Monochamus galloprovincialis pistor (Germar, 1818)
- Monochamus galloprovincialis tauricola Pic, 1912
