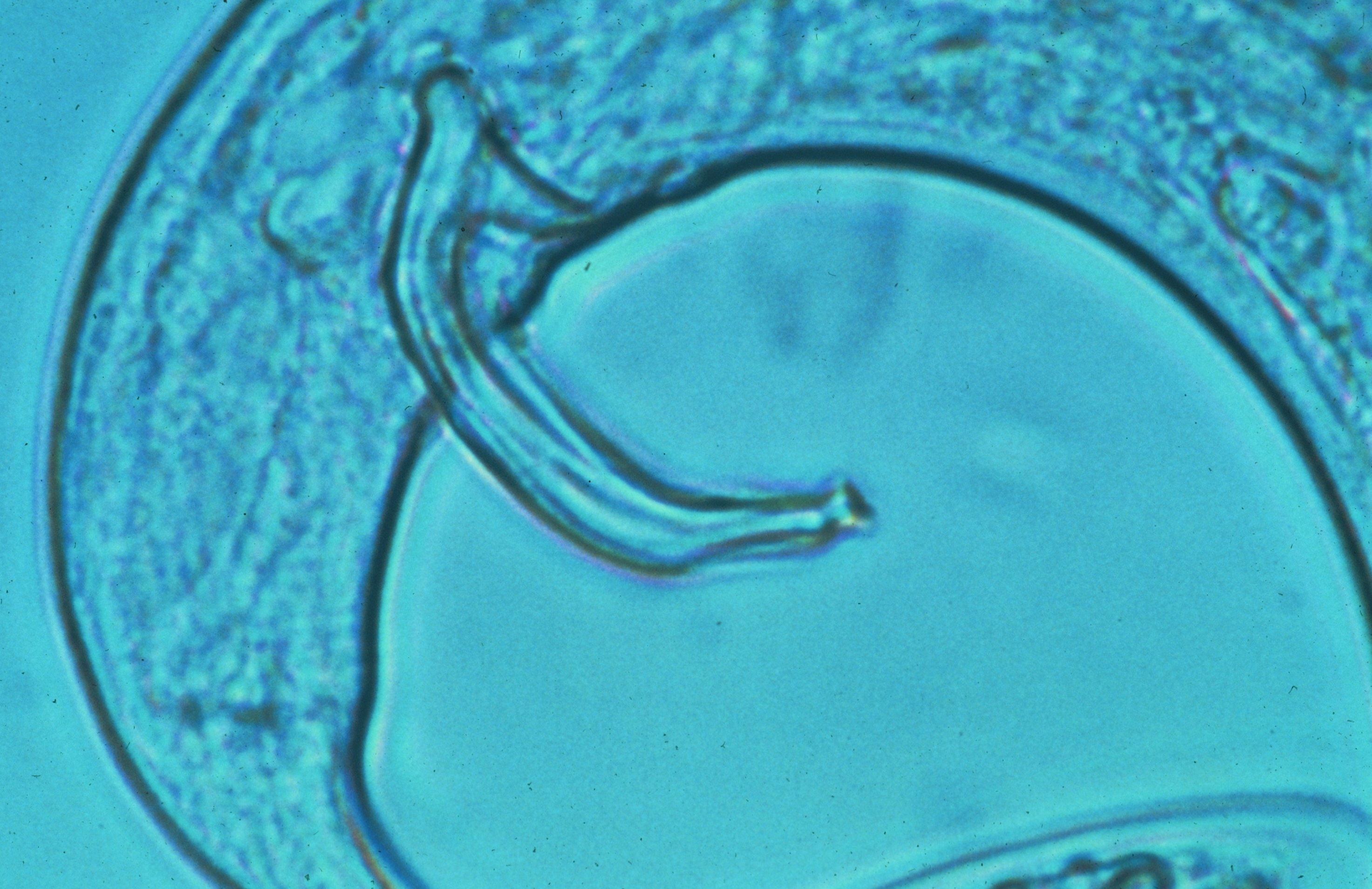
- male with spicule visible

Scientific classification
- Kingdom: Animalia
- Phylum: Nematoda
- Class: Secernentea
- Order: Aphelenchida
- Family: Parasitaphelenchidae
- Genus: Bursaphelenchus
- Species: B. xylophilus

Binomial name
- Bursaphelenchus xylophilus (Steiner & Buhrer 1934) Nickle 1981

= Bursaphelenchus xylophilus =

Species of roundworm

Bursaphelenchus xylophilus, commonly known as pine wood nematode or pine wilt nematode (PWN), is a species of nematode that infects trees in the Pinus genus of coniferous trees and causes the disease pine wilt. While native to North America, it spread in the early 20th century to Japan and in the latter half of the century to other areas of Asia, including China, Taiwan, and Korea, as well as to Europe, including Portugal and Spain.

== History ==
Pine mortality in Japan was first reported by Munemoto Yano (矢野宗幹) in Nagasaki prefecture in 1905.

The nematode was first discovered in the timber of longleaf pine (Pinus palustris) in Louisiana, United States. Steiner and Burhrer reported that the nematode was a new species, and they named it Aphelenchoides xylophilus in 1934. In 1969, Japanese plant pathologists Tomoya Kiyohara (清原友也) and Yozan Tokushige (徳重陽山) discovered many unfamiliar nematodes on dead pine trees around the Kyushu islands in Japan. Then, they experimentally inoculated the nematode to healthy pine and other conifer trees and observed them. The healthy pine trees were killed—especially Japanese red pine (Pinus densiflora) and Japanese black pine (P. thunbergii). However, Jack pine (P. banksiana), loblolly pine (P. taeda), sugi redwood (Cryptomeria japonica), and Hinoki cypress (Chamaecyparis obtusa) trees were able to survive. In 1971, the researchers concluded that the nematode pathogen was the primary contributor to the high mortality of Japanese pine trees.

In 1972, Yasuharu Mamiya (真宮靖治) and Kiyohara incorrectly claimed that the nematode was a new species, which they named Bursaphelenchus lignicolous. A 1981 reclassification united the American and Japanese forms as B. xylophilus.

Pine wilt nematode epidemics have occurred in Japan, particularly during warm, dry summers.

In the late 1970s and 1980s, the nematode was observed to have spread to other countries of Asia outside of Japan, including China, Taiwan, and Korea, and later observed in Europe, including Portugal and Spain. The forests of Portugal have been particularly impacted, as the most abundant species, the maritime pine, comprising almost two-thirds of all trees, is susceptible to the nematode. In the 1990s, further spread of the nematode was reported in Mexico and Nigeria.

Many factors have contributed to the global spread of the nematode, including human activities, in particular infested timber exports, as well as climate change and ecological disturbance.

== Morphology ==
Species of the genus Bursaphelenchus are difficult to distinguish because they are similar in morphology. A positive identification can be made with molecular analyses such as restriction fragment length polymorphism (RFLP).

B. xylophilus is distinguished by three characteristics: the spicule is flattened into a disc-shaped cucullus at the tip, the front vulval lip is flap-like, and the tail of the female is rounded.

== Life cycle ==
The pine wilt nematode has a typical nematode life cycle, with four juvenile stages and an adult stage with both male and female individuals that reproduce sexually. The mycophagous phase of the life cycle takes place in dead or dying wood, where the nematodes live and feed upon fungi, rather than the wood itself. The nematode cannot travel outside of the wood independently; it must be transported by an insect vector.

B. xylophilus has the shortest life cycle of any known parasitic nematode. In laboratory studies in which it is cultured on fungal media, its life cycle is completed in four days. In nature it reproduces most rapidly in the summer, producing large numbers of individuals that spread throughout the resin canal system of susceptible pines, into the trunk, the branches, and the roots. If living tree cells are no longer available the parasite feeds and reproduces on the fungal hyphae growing in the resin canals. While the nematode becomes inactive during the fall and winter, they survive in pine trees through overwintering.

== Digestion ==
Several cellulose binding proteins are predicted by Kikuchi et al 2009. These are similar to the hosts' own expansins.

== Vectors ==
When the nematode was detected, the sawyer beetle was frequently found on dead pine trees, proving an important vector of the nematode, and that the nematode infected healthy pine trees. The nematodes drop off the beetle, and infect healthy pine trees when the adult beetles eat the young pine branches.

The pine wilt nematode is spread by a number of bark beetles and wood borers, typically associated with the genus Monochamus of pine sawyers. Pine sawyers lay their eggs in the bark of dead timber. The growing larva feeds on the wood and pupates in the resulting cavity. Nematodes of the third juvenile stage congregate in the cavity around the pupa, molt into the fourth juvenile stage, and invade the trachea of the adult beetle. During this dispersive stage, the beetle transports the nematode to other trees.

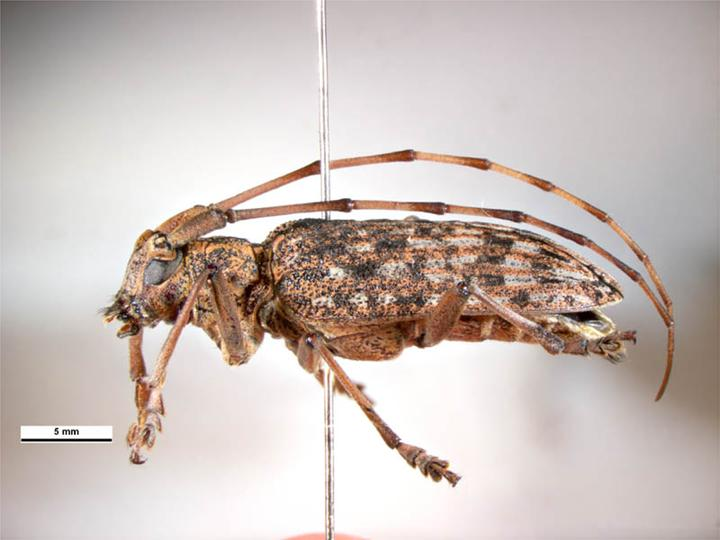
Monochamus alternatus main vector in Japan.

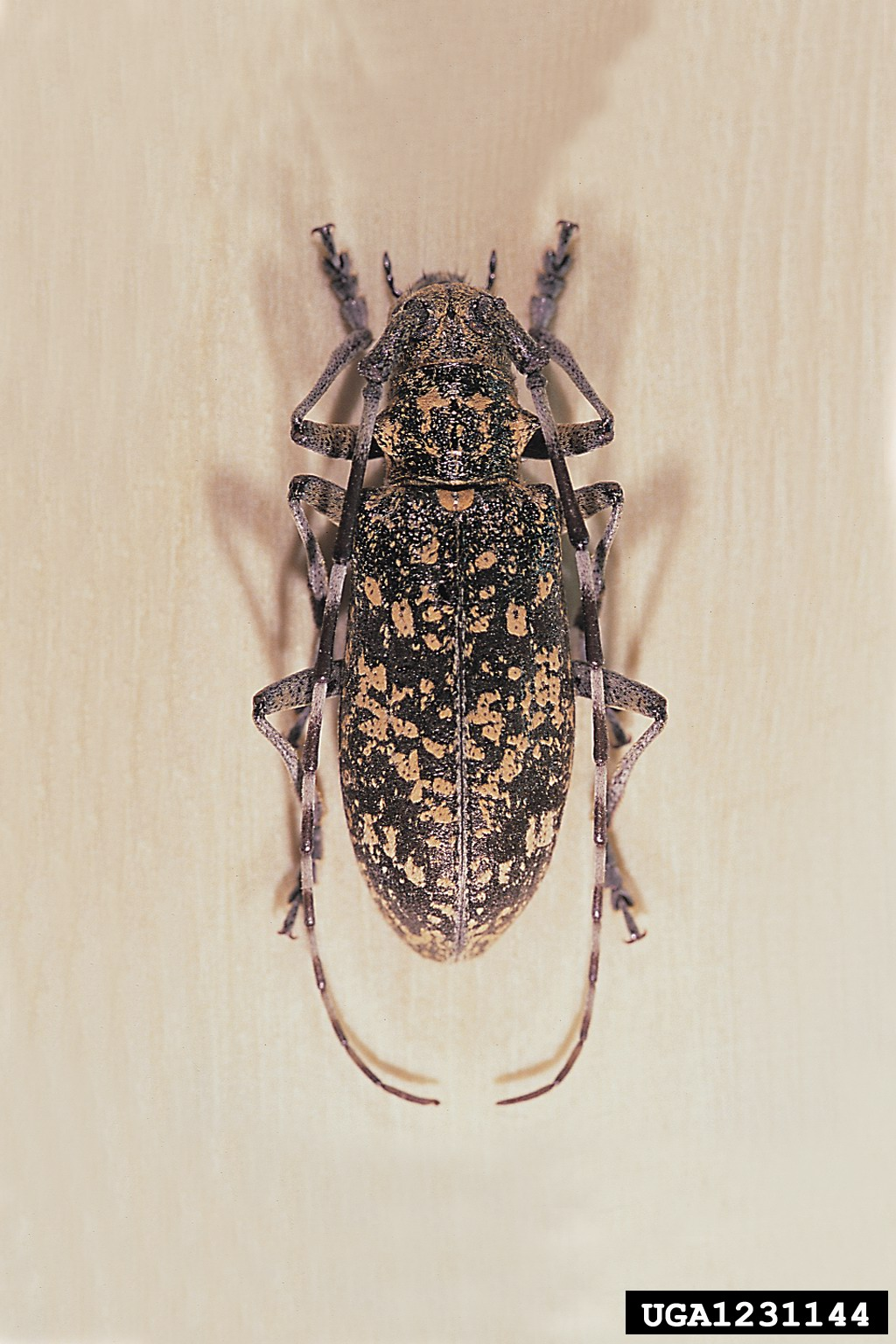
M. saltuarius, secondary vector in Japan.

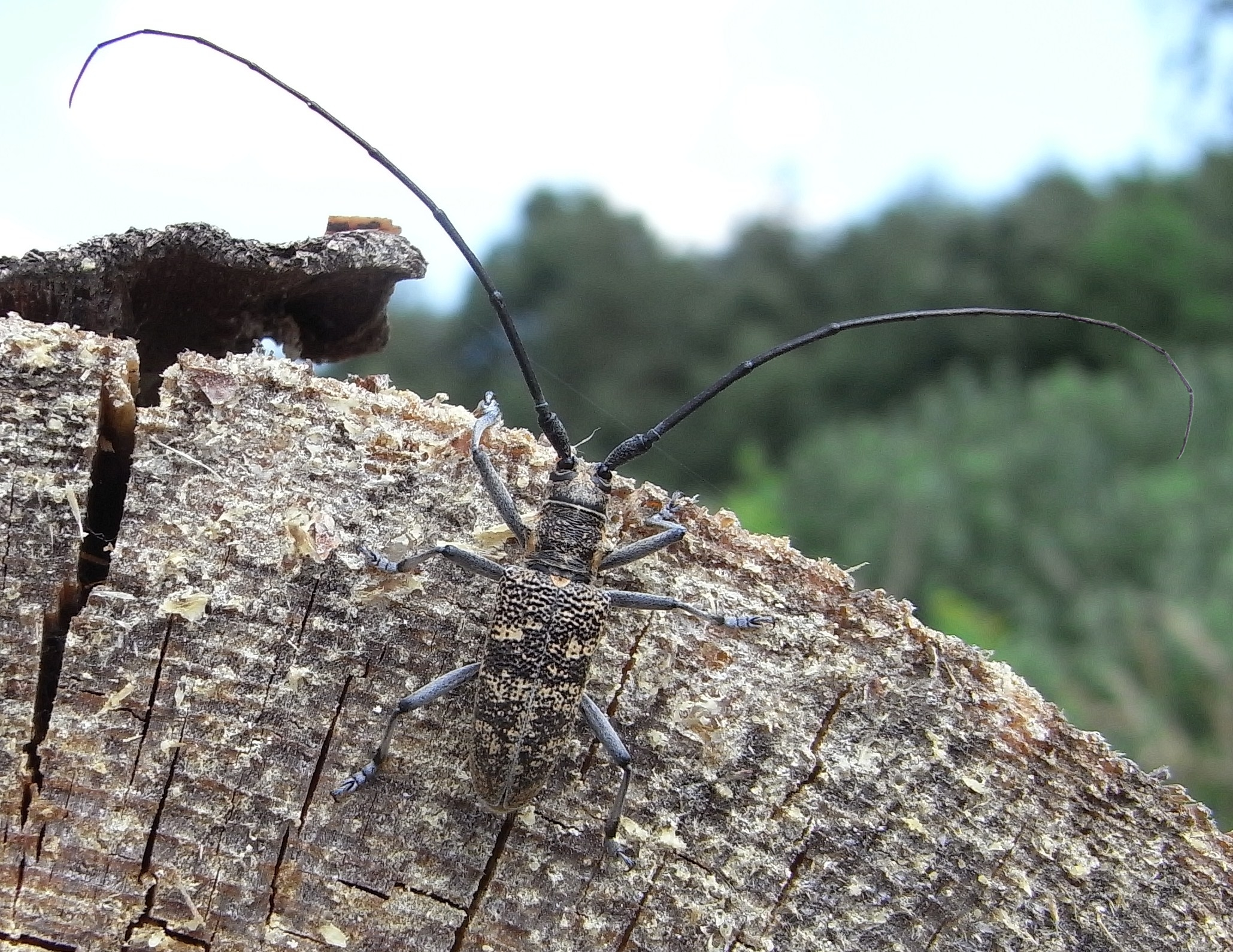
M. galloprovincialis, main vector in Europe

== Mechanism of wilt and spread ==
The mechanism from initial nematode infection to the resultant death of the pine tree is not fully understood. The ultimate death of the tree is caused by the nematode's inhibition of the uptake of water. Small air pockets created by the nematode lead to air embolisms in the xylem tissue which prevents water movement. The embolism does not make tylose or clog the nematode or pine cell. The cause of cavitation and non-reversible embolism is not fully understood. In primary transmission, when the beetle feeds on a susceptible host pine, the pine wilt nematode enters the tree and feeds on the epithelial cells which line the resin ducts. This is referred to as the phytophagous phase of the nematode, and it results in pine wilt disease. Water transport in the tissues of the infested tree is disrupted, and the disease can manifest within as little as a few weeks. Signs include browning of the needles or yellowing of the leaves, and the tree may die within two to three months.

=== Grade of resistance ===
Furuno(1982) observed standing pine trees in Japanese forest and ranked their resistance to pine wood nematode. The "high resistance" pines are rarely killed by the nematode, but young saplings or trees in weakened condition may succumb.

High resistance
Pinus taeda, P. elliottii, P. palustris, P. rigida, P. taiwanensis

Moderate resistance
P. strobus, P. massoniana, P. resinosa, P. tabulaeformis, P. banksiana, P. contorta, P. thumb×P. masso

Moderate susceptibility
P. bungeana, P. monticola, P. parviflora, P. strobiformis, P. densiflora, P. pinaster, P. sylvestris, P. ponderosa, P. rudis, P. pseudostrobus, P. oocarpa, P. radiata, P. greggii

High susceptibility
P. koraiensis, P. leiophylla, P. luchuensis, P. thunbergii, P. nigra, P. mugo, P. khasya, P. muricata

== Ongoing initiatives in Europe ==
The European Commission has enacted protective measures against species harmful to plants. Specific policies targeting B. xylophilus in Portugal were enacted in 2006 before a 2012 expansion to all European Union member states. In 2015, emergency measures further expanded the definition of susceptible wood.

== Management in the field ==
In Japan, scientists and forestry officials believe the most effective preventative technique is the removal of sawyer beetles, the vector of the nematode. The sawyers like to spawn near dying or dead pine trees, so it is advised to cut down these trees until next spring. The timber is subsequently chipped, burned or sprayed with insecticide to kill the sawyer larvae and pupae in the wood. The adult sawyers go out from the timber in late spring or early summer. They start eating young pine growth and spread the nematodes to the tree. Consequently, it is beneficial to kill the adult sawyers at this time to prevent the nematode infection to other trees. In Japan, organophosphorus compounds and neonicotinoids like fenitrothion, malathion, acetamiprid, and thiacloprid are typically used to treat the adult sawyers. However, many environmentalists are opposed to the use of neonicotinoid-based insecticides.

Bioinsecticides are another potential method to treat the sawyers that is currently being researched. Entomopathogenic fungus, woodpeckers, and some parasitoid or prey insects are being investigated. For the pinewood nematode, microbial biocontrol agents have been explored, with promising results.

Embargoes have been placed on untreated lumber from the United States and Canada to prevent the unintentional spread of this disease. Management practices have concentrated on preventing the spread of the nematode. Infected trees are cut and either burned or chipped, soft wood timber is stripped of its bark to prevent oviposition by vectors, and all lumber shipped overseas is either fumigated or kiln-dried. Despite these preventative measures the nematode has been confirmed in Portugal, and may yet spread further in Europe.

fenitrotion (organophosphorus compound)

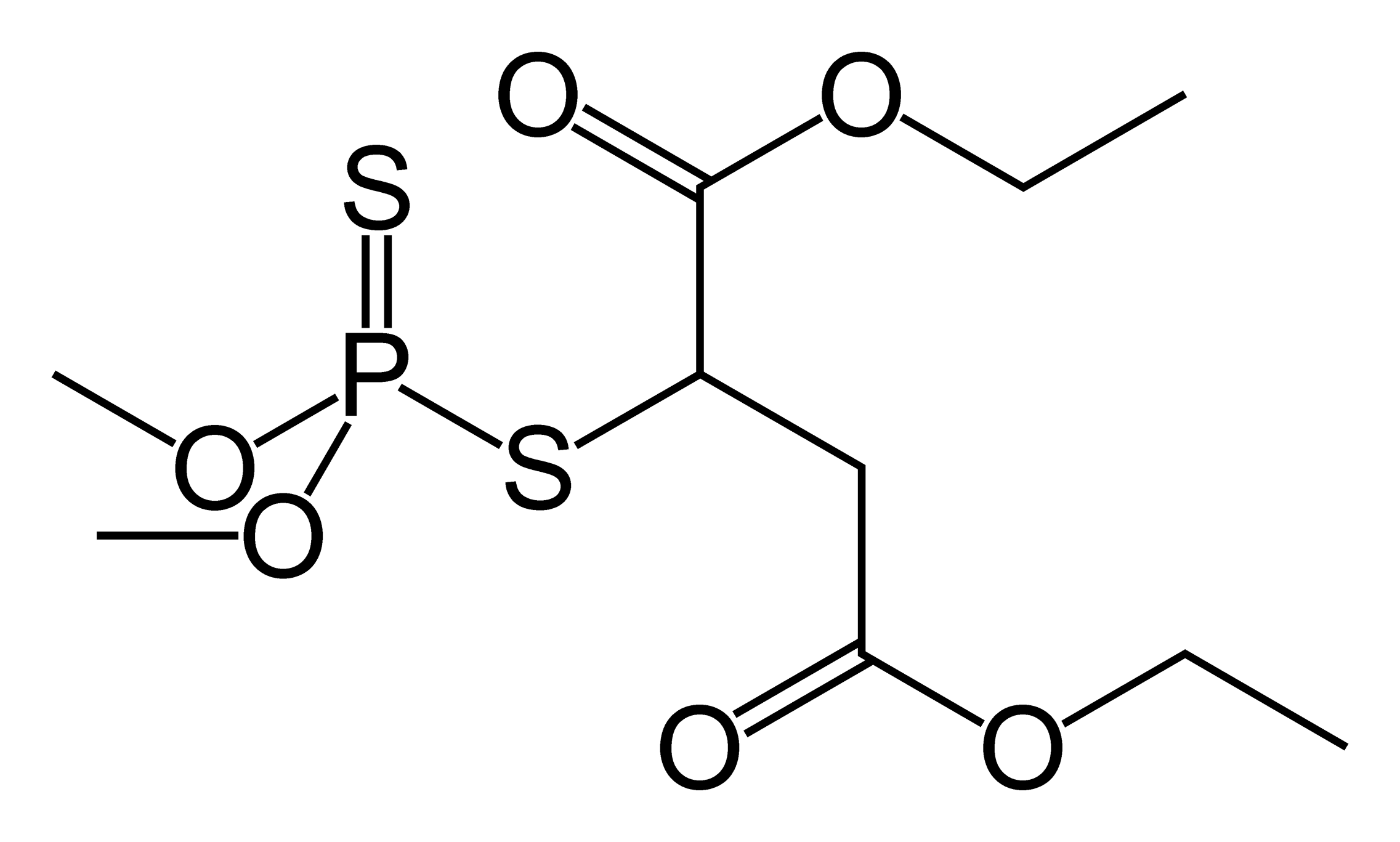
malathion (organophosphorus compound)

acetamiprid (neonicotinoid)

thiacloprid (neonicotinoid)

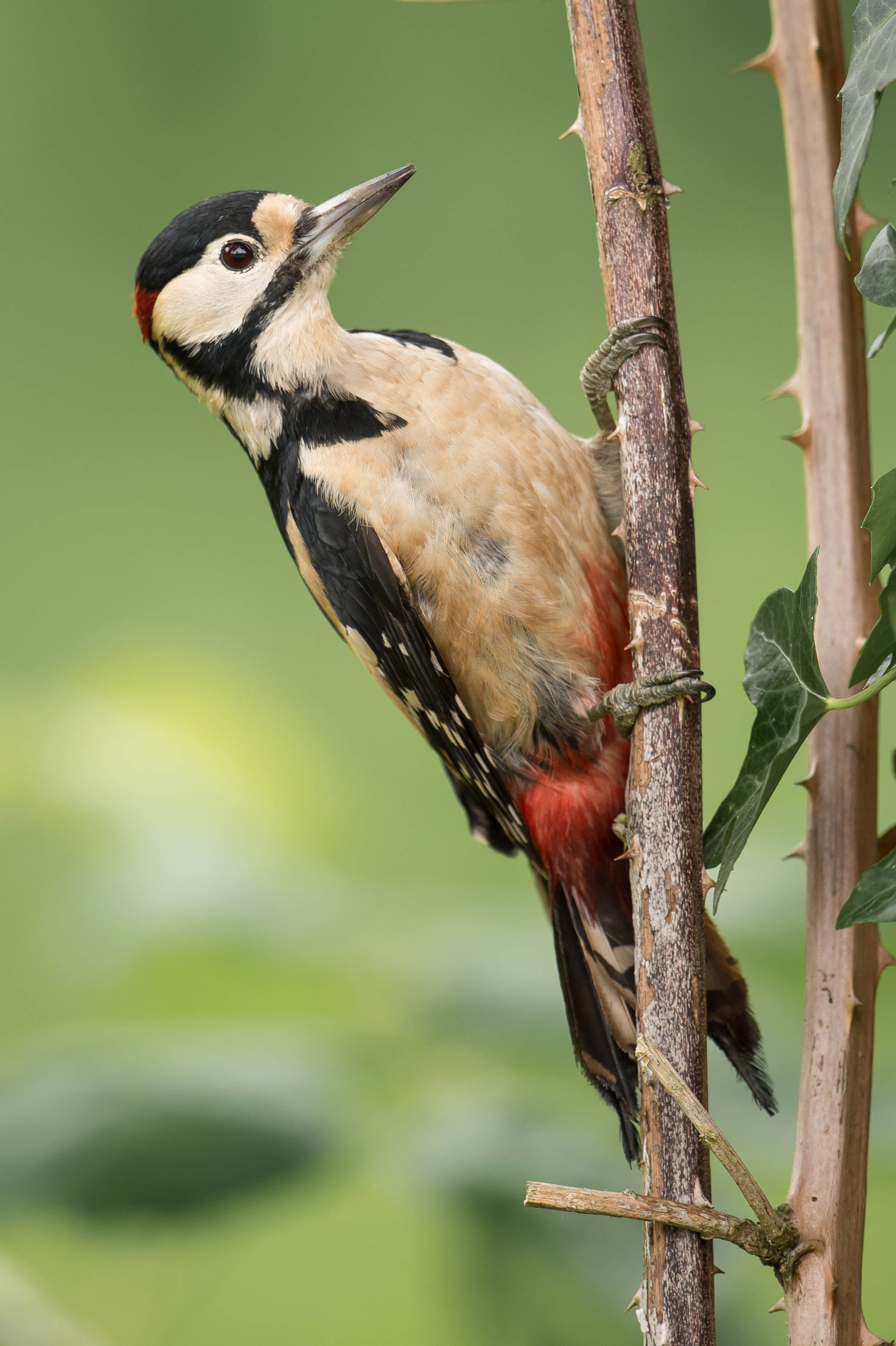
Great spotted woodpecker

In Japan, some nematocides are used to prevent the disease. For example, morantel, mesulfenfos, levamisole, emamectin, milbemectin, and thionazin. Some biopesticides are also being studied, but they remain in the experimental stage. Inoculating infected trees with nematophagous fungus may be a potential treatment for the disease.

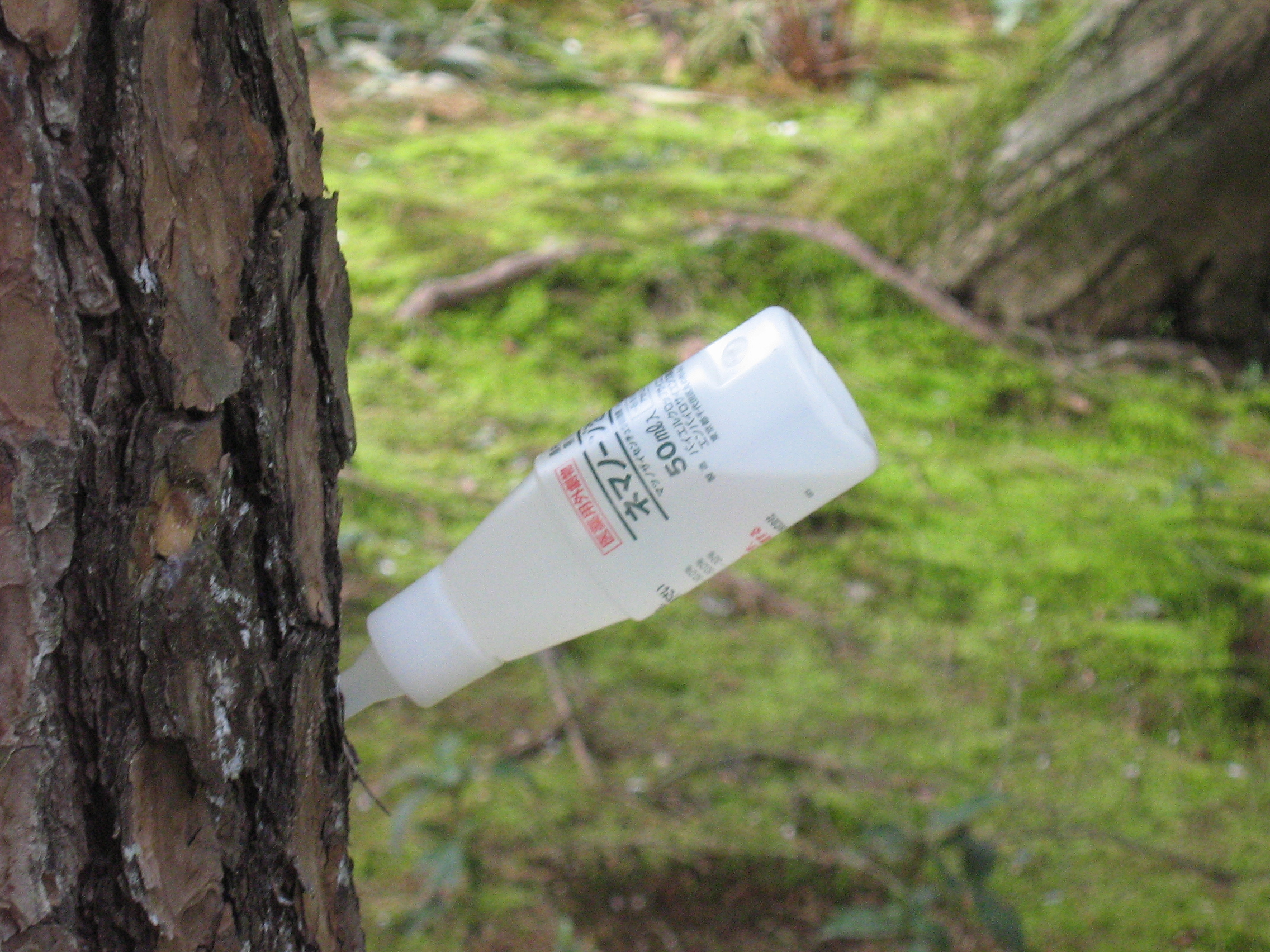
Nematocide applied to a tree

Levamisole

Emamectin

Milbemectin

Thionazin

== Gallery ==
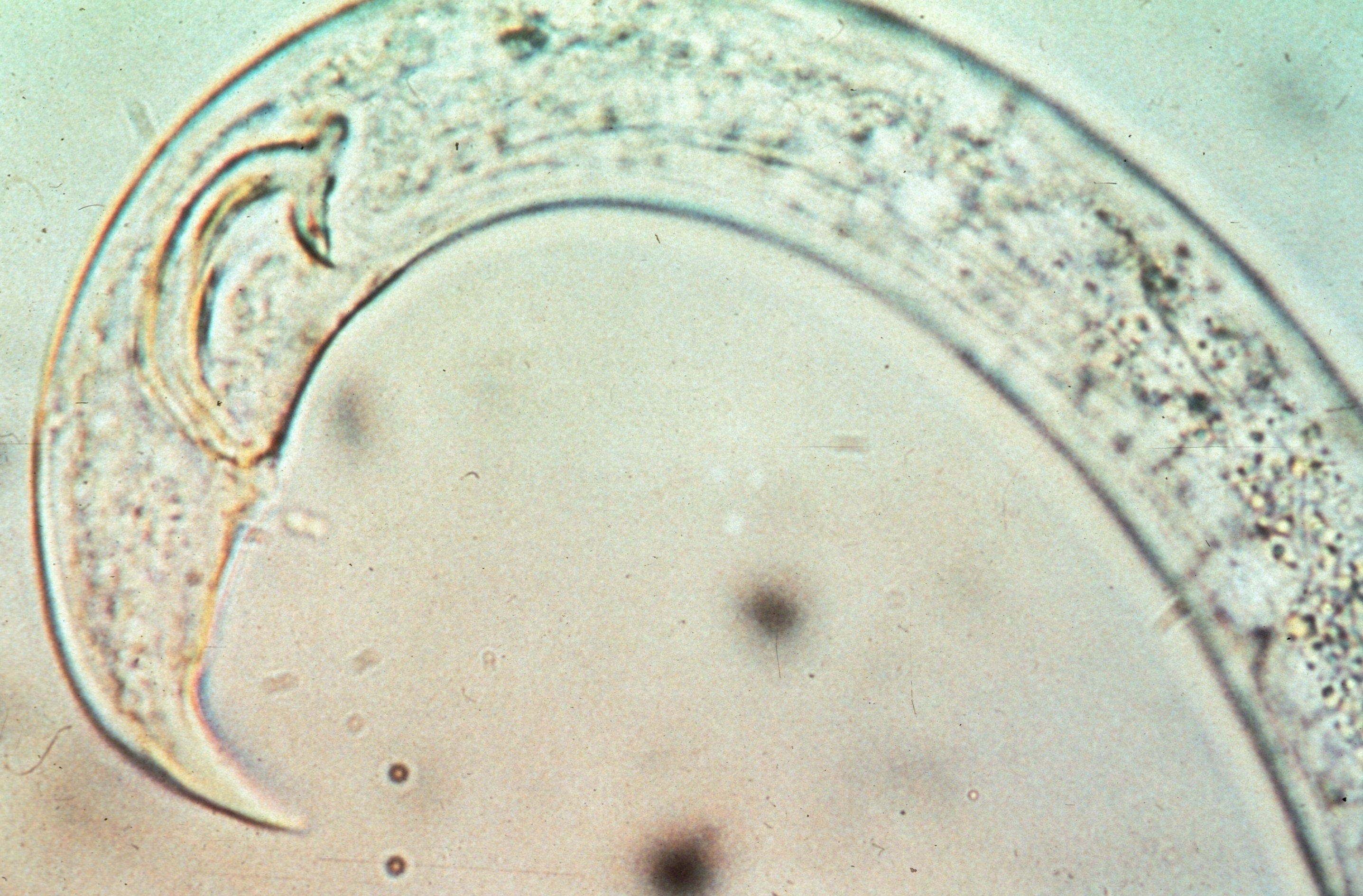
Pointed tail end of the male

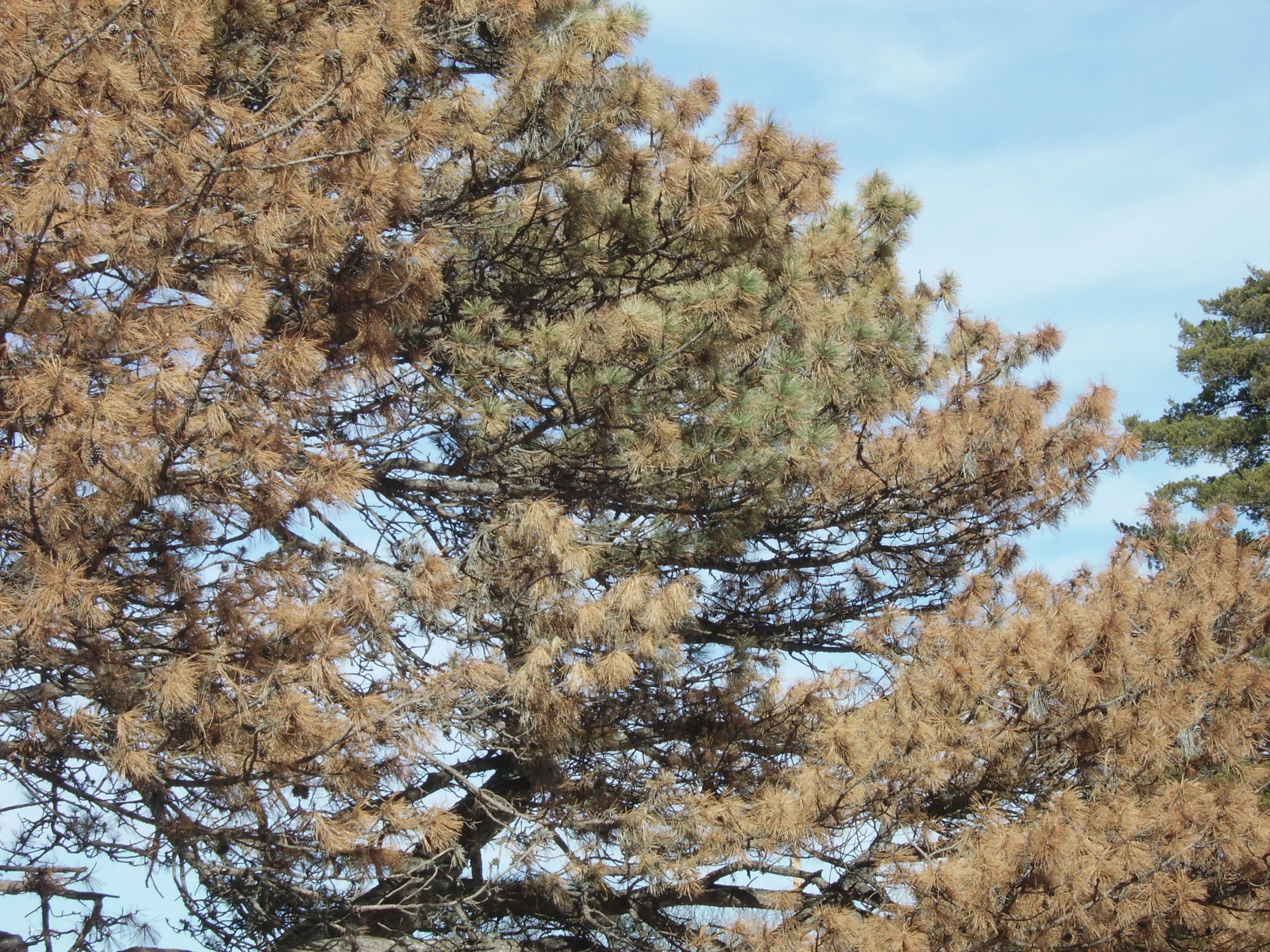
Austrian pine with pine wilt

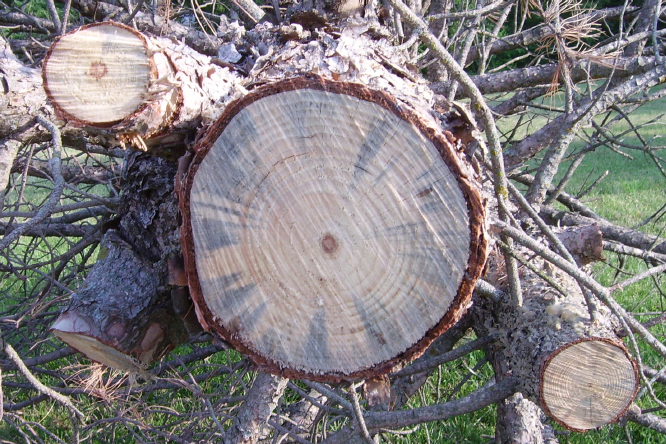
A cross-section of an affected Austrian pine

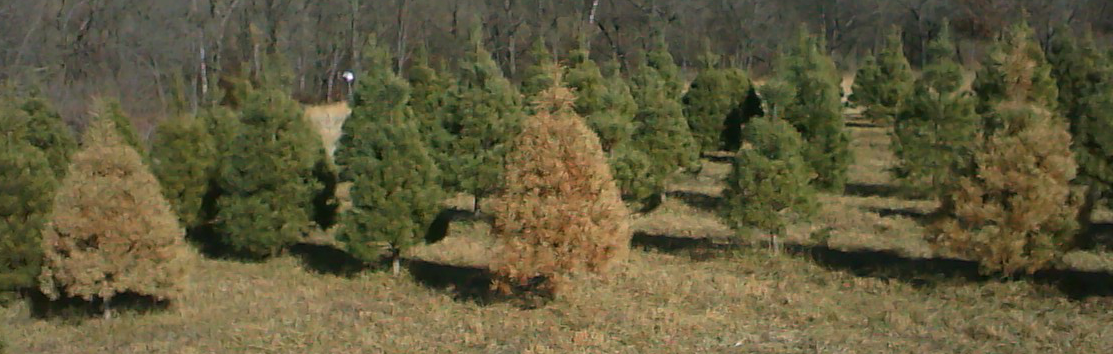
Affected Scots pines on a Christmas tree farm
