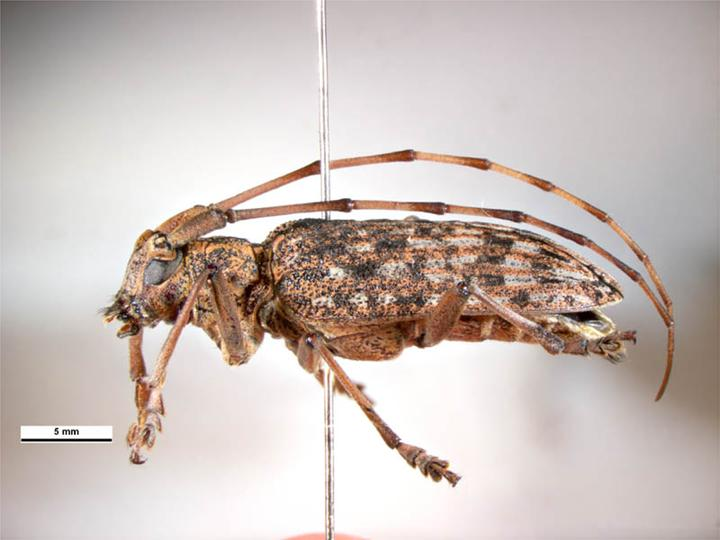
- An adult Japanese pine sawyer

Scientific classification
- Kingdom: Animalia
- Phylum: Arthropoda
- Clade: Pancrustacea
- Class: Insecta
- Order: Coleoptera
- Suborder: Polyphaga
- Infraorder: Cucujiformia
- Family: Cerambycidae
- Genus: Monochamus
- Species: M. alternatus

Binomial name
- Monochamus alternatus Hope, 1842

Synonyms
- Monochamus tesserula Bates, 1873; Monohammus alternatus Hope, 1843

= Monochamus alternatus =

Species of beetle

Monochamus alternatus, the Japanese pine sawyer, is a species of beetle in the family Cerambycidae. It was described by Frederick William Hope in 1842. It is known from Hong Kong, Vietnam, Laos, North Korea, South Korea, Japan, China, and Taiwan. It feeds on Pinus banksiana, Abies firma, Pinus armandii, Pinus massoniana, Pinus yunnanensis, and Pinus densiflora. It serves as a vector for the nematode Bursaphelenchus xylophilus.

== Subspecies ==
- Monochamus alternatus alternatus (Hope, 1843)
- Monochamus alternatus endai Makihara, 2004
