= C26H26N2 =

The molecular formula C_{26}H_{26}N_{2} (molar mass: 366.49 g/mol) may refer to:

- Azipramine, a tetracyclic antidepressant
- Yuehchukene, a dimeric indole alkaloid
