= Ethylsodium =

Names
- Other names sodium ethanide

Identifiers
3D model (JSmol)	Interactive image
Abbreviations	EtNa
ChemSpider	74075875
PubChem CID	13351308
- InChI: InChI=1S/C2H5.Na/c1-2;/h1H2,2H3;/q-1;+1 Key: IZEUYKFIAWOPOS-UHFFFAOYSA-N
- SMILES: C[CH2-].[Na+]

Properties
Chemical formula	C_{2}H_{5}Na
Molar mass	52.052 g·mol^{−1}

Related compounds
Other cations	ethyllithium
Related compounds	Vinyl sodium; Sodium ethoxide; Methyl sodium
- Except where otherwise noted, data are given for materials in their standard state (at 25 °C [77 °F], 100 kPa). Infobox references

Ethyl sodium (or ethylsodium) is an organometallic compound containing sodium ions [Na]^{+} and ethyl anions (ethanide) [CH_{3}CH_{2}]^{−}. It is seldom isolated as a solid product, but can be used as an intermediate in reactions. Ethylsodium is reactive with oxygen, water and most solvents. Only alkanes are inert to ethylsodium, however it does not dissolve in these.

The substance was named by James Alfred Wanklyn in the 1850s.

== Production ==
Ethyl iodide reacts with metallic sodium to yield ethyl sodium. Sodium sand also reacts with ethyl chloride to yield ethyl sodium.

CH_{3}CH_{2}I + 2 Na → CH_{3}CH_{2}Na + NaI
CH_{3}CH_{2}Cl + 2 Na → CH_{3}CH_{2}Na + NaCl

Diethyl zinc reacts with sodium metal to yield a double salt: sodium triethylzincate Na[Zn(CH_{2}CH_{3})_{3}. When heated this gives off ethylene to yield sodium di-μ-hydridobis{diethylzincate(II)}.

A similar double salt is sodium tetraethylaluminate.

Diethyl mercury reacts with sodium to yield ethyl sodium.

== Reactions ==
Ethyl sodium reacts with diethyl ether to make sodium ethoxide, ethane and ethylene:

CH_{3}CH_{2}Na + (CH_{3}CH_{2})_{2}O → C_{2}H_{6} + C_{2}H_{4} + CH_{3}CH_{2}ONa

So ether cannot be used a solvent with ethyl sodium.

Ethyl sodium reacts with carbon monoxide to yield diethyl ketone and triethylcarbinol.

Ethyl sodium reacts with (−)2-bromooctane gives 25% racemic 3-methylnonane, also octane, octylene, and some 7.8-dimethyltetradecane. With (+)2-chlorooctane, similar products are produced.

Benzophenone reacts with ethyl sodium to yield diphenylethylcarbinol (C_{6}H_{5})_{2}(C_{2}H_{5})COH.

Ethylsodium reacts with aromatic ring compounds to replace a hydrogen atom with sodium. These compounds can be carbonated with carbon dioxide to replace the sodium with a carboxylate group, yielding a sodium carboxylate.

For example benzene forms phenyl sodium:

CH_{3}CH_{2}Na + C_{6}H_{6} → C_{6}H_{5}Na + C_{2}H_{6}

Further addition of sodium mainly occurs at meta- and para- positions.

Isopropylbenzene mainly forms meta- and para- compounds with ethylsodium.

Toluene reacts to form benzyl sodium. A second sodium will tend to add at the meta position Xylene is metallated on the methyl groups also. Ethylbenzene has a small amount of the alpha hydrogen replaced by sodium in a reaction with ethylsodium.

Cumene also adds sodium at the alpha position. This reaction position differs from that of bulkier organic sodium compounds:

C_{6}H_{5}CH(CH_{3})_{2} + NaEt → C_{6}H_{5}CNa(CH_{3})_{2}
C_{6}H_{5}CNa(CH_{3})_{2} + CO_{2} → C_{6}H_{5}C(CO_{2}Na)(CH_{3})_{2}(CO_{2}Na) (phenyldimethylacetic acid)

With p-cymene ethylsodium adds sodium to the methyl group.

Mesitylene yields 3,4-dimethylphenlsodium. With diphenylmethane, sodium substitutes on the methylene group.

Furan reacts with NaEt to yield 2-furyl sodium and similarly thiophene reacts to yield 2-thienyl sodium. If one side of the furan is blocked, sodium will add to the other side of the oxygen, so 2-methylfuran produces 5-methyl-2-furyl sodium. In the same way 2-methylthiophene yields 5-methyl-2-thienyl sodium and 2-tert-butylthiophene yields 5-tert-butyl-2-thienyl sodium. 3-Methylthiophene produces 4-methyl-2-thienyl sodium.
