= C16H25NO3 =

The molecular formula C_{16}H_{25}NO_{3} (molar mass: 279.37 g/mol, exact mass: 279.1834 u) may refer to:

- Axomadol
- CAR-302,196
- Moxisylyte, or thymoxamine
