= C14H19N3S =

The molecular formula C_{14}H_{19}N_{3}S (molar mass: 261.39 g/mol, exact mass: 261.1300 u) may refer to:

- Methapyrilene
- Thenyldiamine
