= Wilt disease =

Group of plant diseases

A wilt disease is any number of diseases that affect the vascular system of plants. Attacks by fungi, bacteria, and nematodes can cause rapid killing of plants, large tree branches or even entire trees.

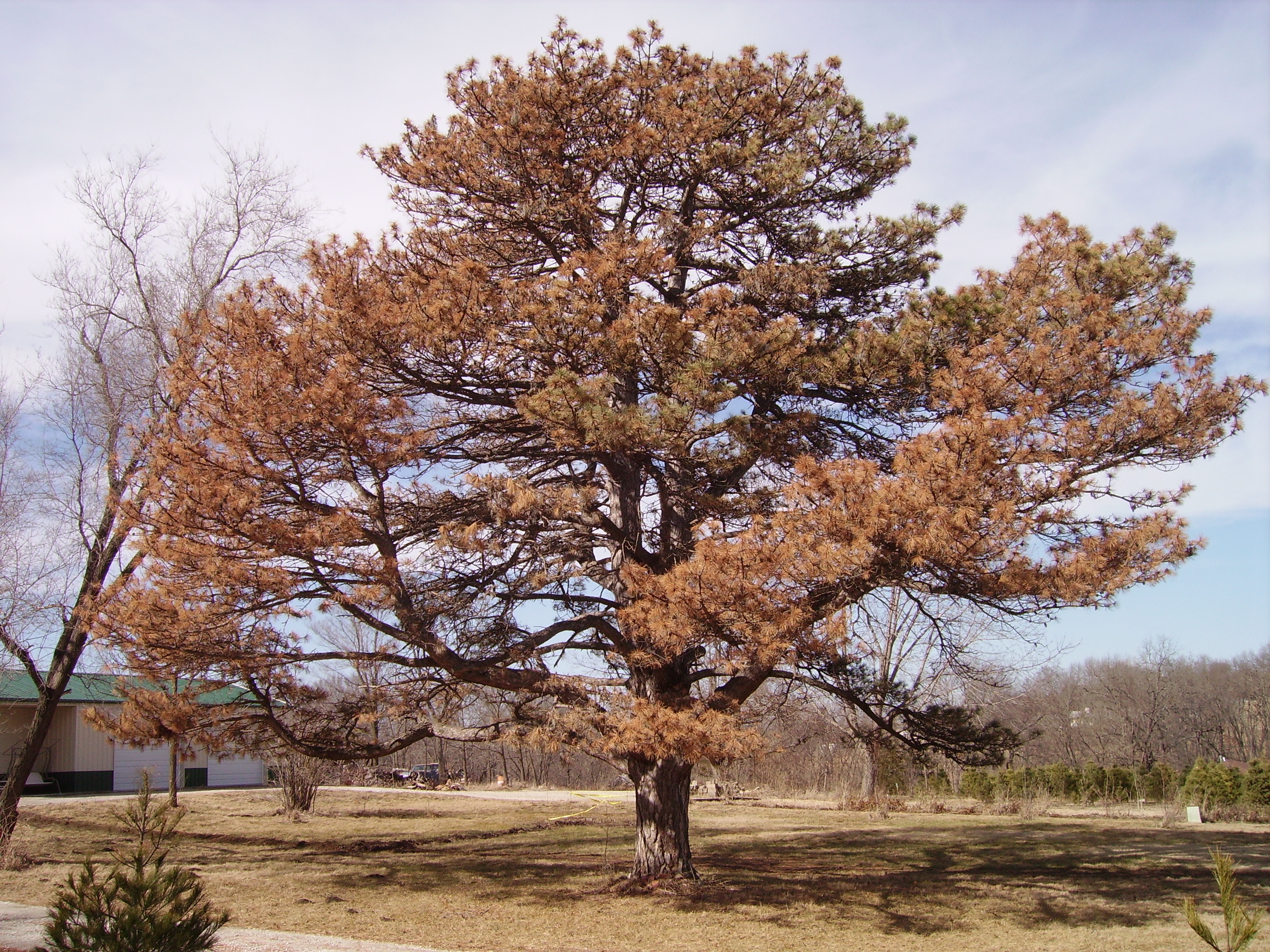
A pine tree with pine wilt

Wilt diseases in woody plants tend to fall into two major categories, those that start with the branches and those that start with the roots. Those that start with the branches most often start with pathogens that feed on the leaves or bark, those that start with the roots start with wounding or direct entry by the pathogen into the roots, some are spread from one plant to another by way of root grafts.

Pathogens that cause wilting diseases invade the vascular vessels and cause the xylem to fail to transport water to the foliage, thus causing wilting of stems and leaves.

== Wilt diseases ==
Wilt diseases include:

=== Bacterial wilt of cucurbits ===
Bacterial wilt of cucurbits is caused by the bacteria Erwinia tracheiphila, it affects cucumber, squash, muskmelon, pumpkin, gourds; certain varieties of cucumber and squash have different degrees of resistance. Once a plant is infected, the bacteria spread through the xylem vessels from the area of infection to the main stem, and the entire plant wilts and dies. Initial symptoms may include the wilting of single leaves and smaller stems. Infected plants may produce a creamy white bacterial ooze when cut. The bacteria survive winter in the digestive tract of striped cucumber beetles and spotted cucumber beetles. In the spring when the beetles are feeding on susceptible plants, the bacteria, which are contained in the fecal matter of the beetles enters the plant through wounds in the epidermis. The bacteria need a film of water to facilitate infection. The bacteria can also be transmitted from one plant to another when beetles feed on an infected plant and the bacteria becomes attached to the beetles mouthparts.

The bacteria Ralstonia solanacearum and related species cause bacterial wilt of bananas and plantains. The same bacteria also cause wilt diseases of potatoes (Solanum tuberosum), tomatoes (Solanum lycopersicum), aubergine (eggplant) (Solanum melongena), banana (Musa species), geranium (Pelargonium species), ginger (Zingiber officinale), tobacco (Nicotiana tabacum), sweet peppers (Capsicum species), olive (Olea europaea), and others.

=== Dutch elm disease ===
Dutch elm disease is caused by the fungus Ophiostoma ulmi, it affects elm trees.

=== Elm yellows ===
Elm yellows sometimes called elm phloem necrosis, affects elm trees and is caused by a Mycoplasma like organism. It is spread by the white-banded leafhopper.

=== Mimosa wilt ===
Mimosa wilt is caused by the fungus Fusarium oxysporum. It enters through the roots and spreads into the vascular system through the tree's sap. As it grows it clogs the vascular tissue leading to yellowing leaves and defoliation.

=== Oak wilt ===
Oak wilt is a fungal caused by Bretziella fagacearum, is a disease originating in eastern Russia. It can slowly or quickly kill an oak tree when the tree reacts to the fungus by plugging its own cambial tissue while attempting to block the spread of the fungus. This plug prevents the cambium vascular tissue from delivering nutrients and water to the rest of the plant, which eventually kills it. Red oaks are very susceptible.

=== Persimmon wilt ===
Persimmon wilt attacks persimmons and is caused by Acromonium diospyri, a fungus. In the United States it has nearly eliminated persimmons from the central basin of Tennessee. Because of its lethality to persimmons, it was proposed as a biological control agent to eliminate unwanted native persimmons.

=== Pine wilt ===
Pine wilt is caused by the North American native pinewood nematode (Bursaphelenchus xylophilus). Where it is indigenous it is not major pathogen of native pine species, but in North America it causes wilt in a few non-native North American pine species. It has been introduced into Japan and China, where it has become a troubling disease of Japanese red pines (Pinus densiflora) and black pines (Pinus thunbergii). Over 46 million cubic meters of trees have been lost alone in Japan over a 50-year period. It is spread among conifers by pine sawyer beetles (Monochamus spp). The nematodes can reproduce quickly in the sapwood under favorable conditions within susceptible pine species, causing wilting and death, sometimes in only a few weeks. North America lumber products are under export restrictions because of the nematode. In the Midwest United States it has killed many Scots pines (Pinus sylvestris), and this attractive tree is no longer recommended for landscaping uses there.

=== Stewart's wilt ===
Stewart's wilt is caused by the bacteria Pantoea stewartii and affects corn plants especially sweet corn. It is a problem in the production of sweet corn in the Northeastern US.

=== Verticillium wilt ===
Verticillium wilt affects over 300 species of eudicot plants caused by one of two species of Verticillium fungus, V. dahliae and V. albo-atrum. Many economically important plants are susceptible including cotton, tomatoes, potatoes, eggplants, peppers and ornamentals, as well as others in natural vegetation communities.

=== Chilli wilt ===
Chilli wilt is caused by fungus Fusarium oxysporum f. sp. capsici. The affected plant dies suddenly as a result of toxins produced by the fungus or by the choking of vascular tissues by the fungal structures.

== See also ==
- Forest pathology
