= Thiophene-2-carboxaldehyde =

Names
- Preferred IUPAC name Thiophene-2-carbaldehyde
- Other names 2-formylthiophene, thiophene-2-aldehyde, T2A, 2-thiophenecarboxaldehyde

Identifiers
CAS Number	98-03-3
3D model (JSmol)	Interactive image
ChEBI	CHEBI:87301
ChEMBL	ChEMBL328441
ChemSpider	7086
ECHA InfoCard	100.002.391
EC Number	202-629-8
PubChem CID	7364
UNII	IW05BB9XBM
CompTox Dashboard (EPA)	DTXSID7052656
- InChI: InChI=1S/C5H4OS/c6-4-5-2-1-3-7-5/h1-4H Key: CNUDBTRUORMMPA-UHFFFAOYSA-N
- SMILES: C1=CSC(=C1)C=O

Properties
Chemical formula	C_{5}H_{4}OS
Molar mass	112.15 g·mol^{−1}
Appearance	colorless liquid
Density	1.2 g/mL
Boiling point	198 °C (388 °F; 471 K)

Hazards
- GHS labelling
Pictograms	(GHS07: Exclamation mark)
Signal word	Warning
Hazard statements	H302, H315, H317, H319, H335
Precautionary statements	P261, P264, P270, P271, P272, P280, P301+P312, P302+P352, P304+P340, P305+P351+P338, P312, P321, P330, P332+P313, P333+P313, P337+P313, P362, P363, P403+P233, P405, P501
- Except where otherwise noted, data are given for materials in their standard state (at 25 °C [77 °F], 100 kPa). Infobox references

Thiophene-2-carboxaldehyde is an organosulfur compound with the formula C_{4}H_{3}SCHO. It is one of two isomeric thiophenecarboxaldehydes. It is a colorless liquid that often appears amber after storage. It is versatile precursor to many drugs including eprosartan, Azosemide, and Teniposide.

== Preparation ==
It can be prepared from thiophene by the Vilsmeier reaction. Alternatively, it is prepared from chloromethylation of thiophene.
