= Azaribine =

Chemical compound

Clinical data
- Trade names: Triazure

Legal status
- Legal status: US: Withdrawn

Identifiers
- IUPAC name: [(2R,3R,4R,5R)-3,4-diacetyloxy-5-(3,5-dioxo-1,2,4-triazin-2-yl)oxolan-2-yl]methyl acetate
- CAS Number: 2169–64–4
- PubChem CID: 16574
- ChemSpider: 15714
- UNII: K1U80DO9EB
- KEGG: D03029
- ChEBI: CHEBI:88272
- ChEMBL: ChEMBL515914
- CompTox Dashboard (EPA): DTXSID1022635
- ECHA InfoCard: 100.016.832

Chemical and physical data
- Formula: C_{14}H_{17}N_{3}O_{9}
- Molar mass: 371.302 g·mol^{−1}
- 3D model (JSmol): Interactive image
- SMILES: CC(=O)OC[C@@H]1[C@H]([C@H]([C@@H](O1)N2C(=O)NC(=O)C=N2)OC(=O)C)OC(=O)C
- InChI: InChI=1S/C14H17N3O9/c1-6(18)23-5-9-11(24-7(2)19)12(25-8(3)20)13(26-9)17-14(22)16-10(21)4-15-17/h4,9,11-13H,5H2,1-3H3,(H,16,21,22)/t9-,11-,12-,13-/m1/s1; Key:QQOBRRFOVWGIMD-OJAKKHQRSA-N

Azaribine (triacetyl-6-azauridine) is a drug developed by Calbiochem for the treatment of psoriasis, and also has anti-cancer and antiviral activities. It is a prodrug which is metabolised to the nucleoside analogue 6-azauridine in the body.

Azaribine received FDA approval in 1975 for the treatment of severe psoriasis, but was subsequently withdrawn from the market in 1976 (with its New Drug Application formally revoked in 1977), following reports of life-threatening thromboembolic events. These side effects, including both arterial and venous thrombosis, are primarily attributed to azaribine acting as a vitamin B_{6} antagonist, which induces a severe functional deficiency of pyridoxal phosphate and the resultant hyperhomocysteinemia. However, it continues to be researched as a potential agent for the treatment of emerging viral diseases.
