= 3-Methylthiophene =

Names
- Preferred IUPAC name 3-Methylthiophene
- Other names 3-Thiotolene

Identifiers
CAS Number	616-44-4
3D model (JSmol)	Interactive image
ChEBI	CHEBI:89007
ChemSpider	21111820
ECHA InfoCard	100.009.530
EC Number	210-482-6
PubChem CID	12024
UNII	FK9ID0X5QV
CompTox Dashboard (EPA)	DTXSID8060666
- InChI: InChI=1S/C5H6S/c1-5-2-3-6-4-5/h2-4H,1H3 Key: QENGPZGAWFQWCZ-UHFFFAOYSA-N
- SMILES: CC1=CSC=C1

Properties
Chemical formula	C_{5}H_{6}S
Molar mass	98.16 g·mol^{−1}
Appearance	colorless liquid
Density	1.016 g/cm^{3}
Melting point	−69 °C (−92 °F; 204 K)
Boiling point	114 °C (237 °F; 387 K)
Solubility in water	0.4 g/l

Hazards
- GHS labelling
Pictograms	(GHS02: Flammable) (GHS07: Exclamation mark)
Signal word	Danger
Hazard statements	H225, H302, H312, H315, H319, H332, H335
Precautionary statements	P210, P233, P240, P241, P242, P243, P261, P264, P270, P271, P280, P301+P312, P302+P352, P303+P361+P353, P304+P312, P304+P340, P305+P351+P338, P312, P321, P322, P330, P332+P313, P337+P313, P362, P363, P370+P378, P403+P233, P403+P235, P405, P501
- Except where otherwise noted, data are given for materials in their standard state (at 25 °C [77 °F], 100 kPa). Infobox references

3-Methylthiophene is an organosulfur compound with the formula CH_{3}C_{4}H_{3}S. It is a colorless, flammable liquid. It can be produced by sulfidation of 2-methylsuccinate. Like its isomer 2-methylthiophene, its commercial synthesis involvess vapor-phase dehydrogenation of suitable precursors. 3-Methylthiophene is a precursor to the drug thenyldiamine and the pesticide morantel.
