= Thionazin =

Names
- Preferred IUPAC name O,O-Diethyl O-(pyrazin-2-yl) phosphorothioate
- Other names O,O-Diethyl-O-pyrazin-2-ylthiophosphate; Thionazine; Nemaphos; Zinophos

Identifiers
CAS Number	297-97-2
3D model (JSmol)	Interactive image
ChemSpider	8915
ECHA InfoCard	100.005.500
PubChem CID	9272
UNII	KLQ2UIW7HT
CompTox Dashboard (EPA)	DTXSID8042470
- InChI: InChI=1S/C8H13N2O3PS/c1-3-11-14(15,12-4-2)13-8-7-9-5-6-10-8/h5-7H,3-4H2,1-2H3 Key: IRVDMKJLOCGUBJ-UHFFFAOYSA-N; InChI=1/C8H13N2O3PS/c1-3-11-14(15,12-4-2)13-8-7-9-5-6-10-8/h5-7H,3-4H2,1-2H3 Key: IRVDMKJLOCGUBJ-UHFFFAOYAY
- SMILES: S=P(Oc1nccnc1)(OCC)OCC

Properties
Chemical formula	C_{8}H_{13}N_{2}O_{3}PS
Molar mass	248.24 g·mol^{−1}
- Except where otherwise noted, data are given for materials in their standard state (at 25 °C [77 °F], 100 kPa). Infobox references

Thionazin is a chemical compound used in nematicides.
