= Astromicin =

Chemical compound

Clinical data
- AHFS/Drugs.com: International Drug Names
- Routes of administration: IV
- ATC code: none

Legal status
- Legal status: In general: ℞ (Prescription only)

Identifiers
- IUPAC name: 2-Amino-N-[(1S,2R,3R,4S,5S,6R)-4-amino-3-[(2R,3R,6S)-3-amino-6-(1-aminoethyl)oxan-2-yl]oxy-2,5-dihydroxy-6-methoxycyclohexyl]-N-methylacetamide
- CAS Number: 55779-06-1
- PubChem CID: 65345
- ChemSpider: 4447577
- UNII: 7JHD84H15J
- KEGG: D07470
- ChEBI: CHEBI:37923
- ChEMBL: ChEMBL1909053
- CompTox Dashboard (EPA): DTXSID2022624

Chemical and physical data
- Formula: C_{17}H_{35}N_{5}O_{6}
- Molar mass: 405.496 g·mol^{−1}
- 3D model (JSmol): Interactive image
- SMILES: O=C(N(C)[C@@H]2[C@@H](OC)[C@@H](O)[C@H](N)[C@@H](O[C@H]1O[C@H]([C@@H](N)C)CC[C@H]1N)[C@@H]2O)CN
- InChI: InChI=1S/C17H35N5O6/c1-7(19)9-5-4-8(20)17(27-9)28-15-11(21)13(24)16(26-3)12(14(15)25)22(2)10(23)6-18/h7-9,11-17,24-25H,4-6,18-21H2,1-3H3/t7-,8+,9-,11-,12-,13-,14+,15+,16+,17+/m0/s1; Key:BIDUPMYXGFNAEJ-APGVDKLISA-N

Astromicin (INN; also frequently referenced in scientific journal articles as fortimicin A/B) is an aminoglycoside antibiotic. It is produced by Micromonospora olivasterospora (also named with additional o in olivoasterospora).
