= 2-Methylthiophene =

Names
- Preferred IUPAC name 2-Methylthiophene
- Other names Methylthiol

Identifiers
CAS Number	554-14-3
3D model (JSmol)	Interactive image
ChemSpider	21168808
ECHA InfoCard	100.008.240
EC Number	209-063-0
PubChem CID	11126
UNII	7115JAP77A
CompTox Dashboard (EPA)	DTXSID3060291
- InChI: InChI=1S/C5H6S/c1-5-3-2-4-6-5/h2-4H,1H3 Key: XQQBUAPQHNYYRS-UHFFFAOYSA-N
- SMILES: CC1=CC=CS1

Properties
Chemical formula	C_{5}H_{6}S
Molar mass	98.16 g·mol^{−1}
Appearance	colorless liquid
Density	1.0168 g/cm^{3}
Melting point	−63.4 °C (−82.1 °F; 209.8 K)
Boiling point	112.6 °C (234.7 °F; 385.8 K)

Hazards
- GHS labelling
Pictograms	(GHS02: Flammable) (GHS07: Exclamation mark)
Signal word	Danger
Hazard statements	H225, H302, H312, H332
Precautionary statements	P210, P233, P240, P241, P242, P243, P261, P264, P270, P271, P280, P301+P312, P302+P352, P303+P361+P353, P304+P312, P304+P340, P312, P322, P330, P363, P370+P378, P403+P235, P501
- Except where otherwise noted, data are given for materials in their standard state (at 25 °C [77 °F], 100 kPa). Infobox references

2-Methylthiophene is an organosulfur compound with the formula CH_{3}C_{4}H_{3}S. It is a colorless, flammable liquid. It can be produced by Wolff-Kishner reduction of thiophene-2-carboxaldehyde. Its commercial synthesis involvess vapor-phase dehydrogenation of a 1-pentanol/CS_{2} mixture.

== See also ==
- 3-Methylthiophene
