= Atiprimod =

Chemical compound

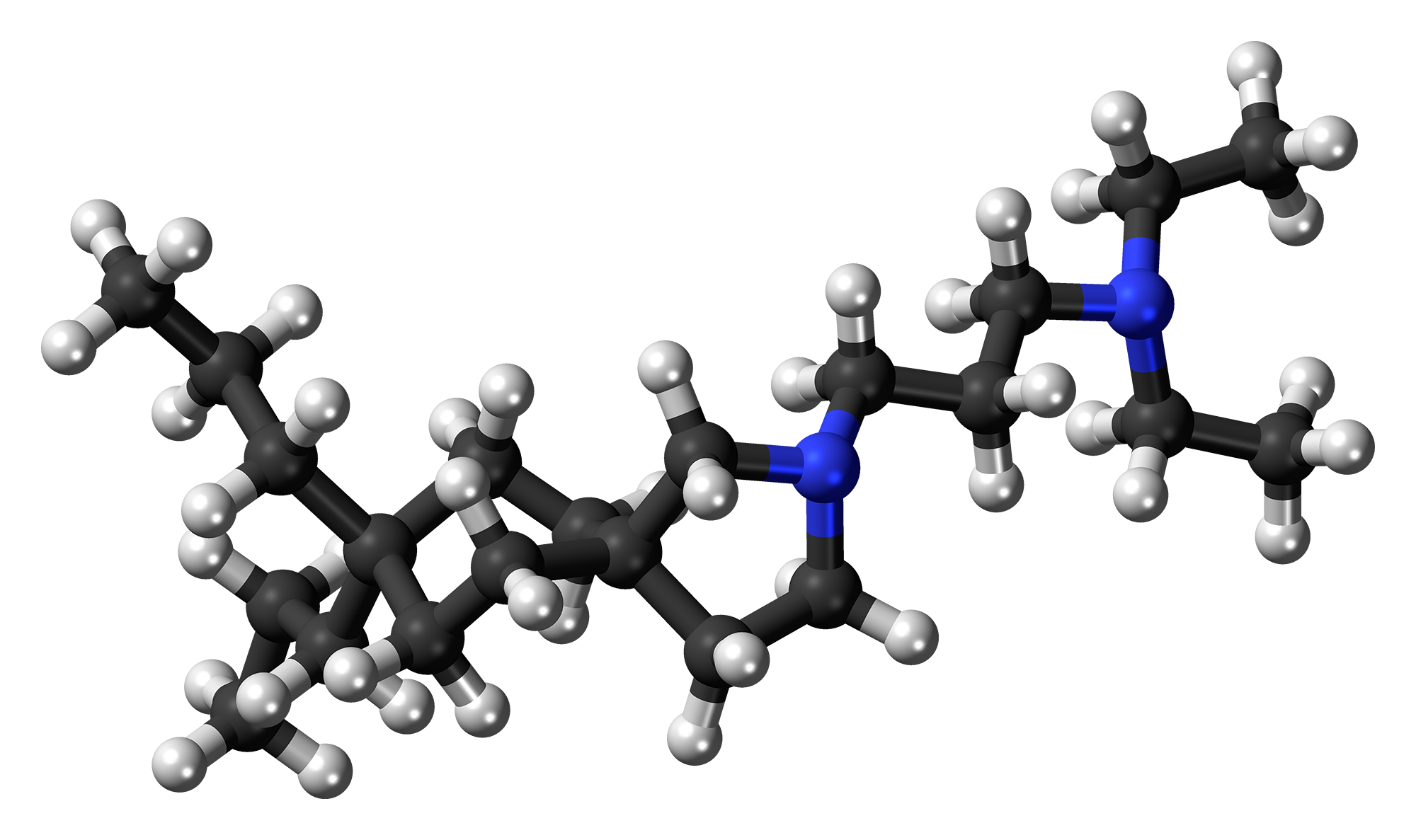

Clinical data
- ATC code: none

Identifiers
- IUPAC name: 3-(8,8-dipropyl-3-azaspiro[4.5]decan-3-yl)-N,N- diethylpropan-1-amine
- CAS Number: 123018-47-3
- PubChem CID: 129869
- ChemSpider: 114962
- UNII: MG7D3QD743
- KEGG: D03003
- ChEMBL: ChEMBL103735
- CompTox Dashboard (EPA): DTXSID10153834

Chemical and physical data
- Formula: C_{22}H_{44}N_{2}
- Molar mass: 336.608 g·mol^{−1}
- 3D model (JSmol): Interactive image
- SMILES: N(CC)(CC)CCCN2CCC1(CCC(CC1)(CCC)CCC)C2
- InChI: InChI=1S/C22H44N2/c1-5-10-21(11-6-2)12-14-22(15-13-21)16-19-24(20-22)18-9-17-23(7-3)8-4/h5-20H2,1-4H3; Key:SERHTTSLBVGRBY-UHFFFAOYSA-N

Atiprimod (INN, codenamed SK&F106615) is a substance being studied in the treatment of certain multiple myelomas and other advanced cancers. It may block the growth of tumors and the growth of blood vessels from surrounding tissue to the tumor. This drug is also being researched as a potential treatment for various autoimmune diseases.

It was first developed by GlaxoSmithKline as a potential treatment for rheumatoid arthritis.

This compound has also been shown to kill mantle cell lymphoma cells in vitro.

== Mechanism of action ==
Atiprimod has been shown to inhibit angiogenesis (growth of blood vessels) in a blood vessel model using chicken eggs. It is thought to inhibit the secretion of vascular endothelial growth factor (VEGF), a growth factor that promotes angiogenesis.

== Chemistry ==
Atiprimod is an amphiphilic compound that exists as a cation at neutral pH and belongs to the heterocyclic class of azaspiranes.

== Synthesis ==
The first part of the synthesis uses protocols that were used for Pramiverine and agents including SIR 117. The second half of the synthesis shares features that are consonant with RS 86 and RAC-109 [17592-97-1].

Synthesis: Patent: Dof:

The Johnson–Corey–Chaykovsky reaction on 4-Heptanone [123-19-3] (1) gives 2,2-dipropyloxirane [98560-25-9] (2). Treatment with Boron trifluoride etherate [109-63-7] gave 2-Propylpentanal [18295-59-5] (3). Upon acid treatment with Methyl vinyl ketone [78-94-4] (4) this led to 4,4-Dipropylcyclohex-2-enone [60729-41-1] (5). Catalytic hydrogenation of the enone olefin yielded 4,4-Dipropylcyclohexanone [123018-62-2] (7). The Knoevenagel condensation with ethyl 2-cyanoacetate [1187-46-8] (8) led to Cyano-(4,4-dipropyl-cyclohexylidene)-acetic acid ethyl ester [130065-93-9] (8). Conjugate addition of cyanide anion led to ethyl 2-cyano-2-(1-cyano-4,4-dipropylcyclohexyl)acetate, PC45358714 (9). Acid hydrolysis of both the nitrile groups to acids, saponification of the ester, and decarboxylation of the geminal diacid gave 1-(carboxymethyl)-4,4-dipropylcyclohexane-1-carboxylic acid [130065-94-0] (10). Treatment with acetic anhydride gave 8,8-Dipropyl-2-oxaspiro[4.5]decane-1,3-dione [123018-64-4] (11). Condensation with 3-Diethylaminopropylamine [104-78-9] (12) gave the imide and hence, 2-[3-(diethylamino)propyl]-8,8-dipropyl-2-azaspiro[4.5]decane-1,3-dione, PC15634126 (13). Finally reduction of both carbonyl groups with lithium aluminium hydride completed the synthesis of Atiprimod (14).

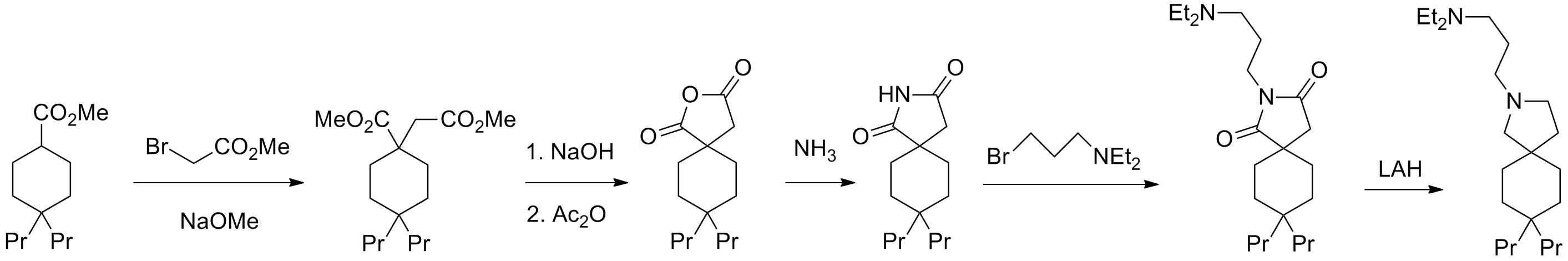
Lednicer (unofficial) synthesis
