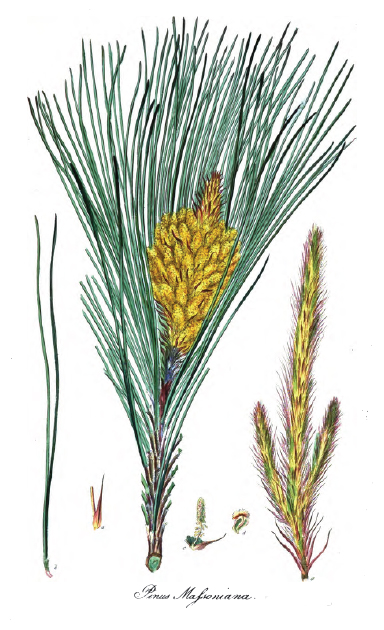

Conservation status
- Least Concern (IUCN 3.1)

Scientific classification
- Kingdom: Plantae
- Clade: Tracheophytes
- Clade: Gymnosperms
- Division: Pinophyta
- Class: Pinopsida
- Order: Pinales
- Family: Pinaceae
- Genus: Pinus
- Subgenus: P. subg. Pinus
- Section: P. sect. Pinus
- Subsection: P. subsect. Pinus
- Species: P. massoniana

Binomial name
- Pinus massoniana Lamb.

= Pinus massoniana =

Masson's pine

Species of conifer

Pinus massoniana, commonly known as Masson's pine or Chinese red pine, is a species of conifer in the family Pinaceae. It is a pine native to Taiwan, a wide area of central and southern China, including Hong Kong, and northern Vietnam.

The specific Latin epithet massoniana refers to Scottish botanist Francis Masson. The distinctive shape of the leaf clusters, which resemble a horse's tail, has given rise to the species' Chinese common name 馬尾松, lit. 'horse-tail pine'.

== Description ==
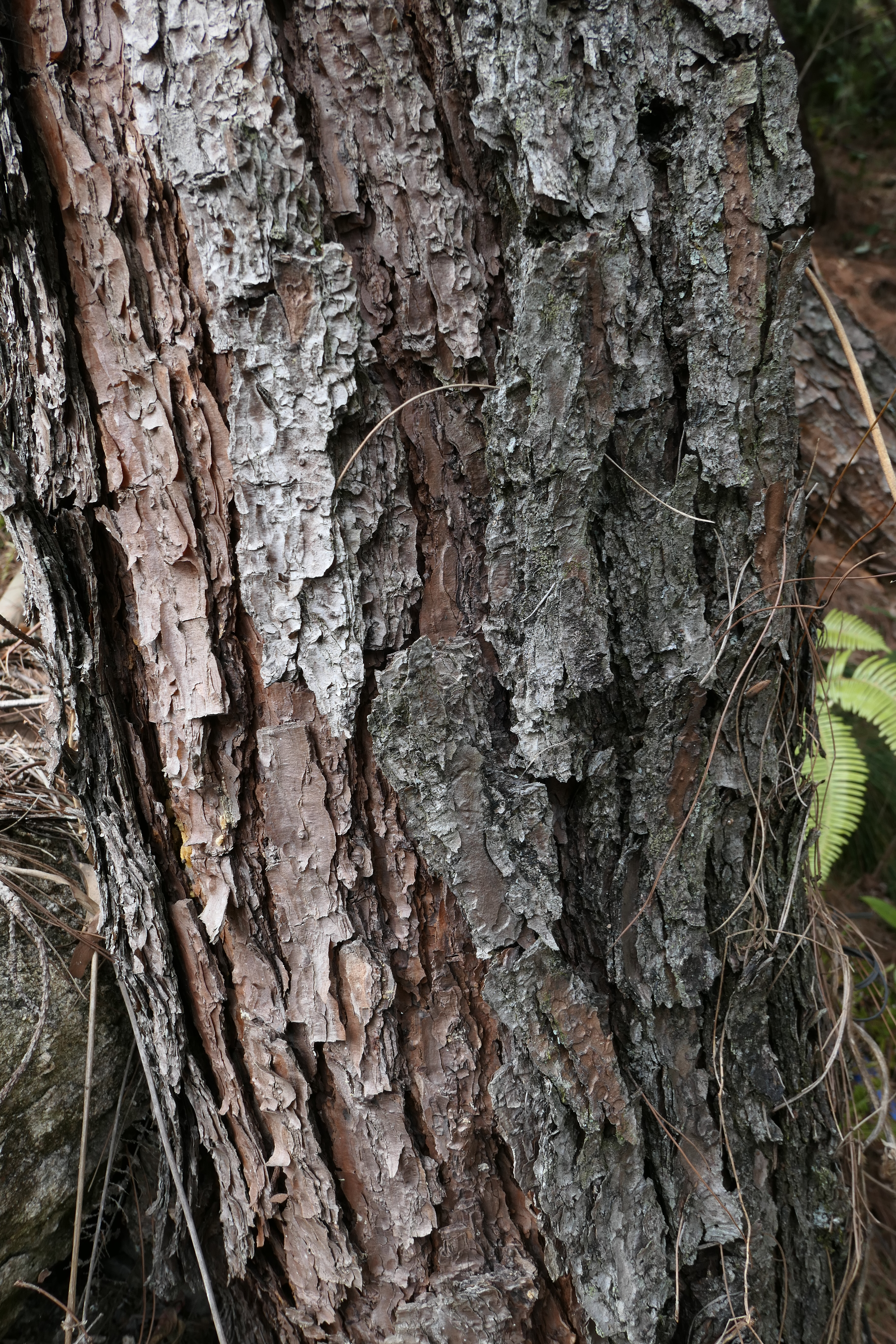
bark close-up

It is an evergreen tree reaching 25–45 metres (82–148 feet) in height, with a broad, rounded crown of long branches. The bark is thick, grayish-brown, and scaly plated at the base of the trunk, and orange-red, thin, and flaking higher on the trunk. The leaves are needle-like, dark green, with two per fascicle, 12–20 centimetres (4 1/2–8 inches) long and 0.8–1 millimetre (1/32–3/64 in) wide, the persistent fascicle sheath 1.5–2 cm (5/8–3/4 in) long. The cones are ovoid, 4–7 cm (1 5/8–2 3/4 in) long, chestnut-brown, opening when mature in late winter to 4–6 cm (1 5/8–2 3/8 in) broad. The seeds are winged, 4–6 mm (5/32–1/4 in) long with a 10–15 mm (3/8–9/16 in) wing. Pollination occurs in mid-spring, with the cones maturing 18–20 months after. From genomic sequencing it has an exceptionally large 21.91 Gb genome and 80,366 protein-coding genes.

=== Life cycle ===
Pollination is from April to May, and the cones are mature from October to December of the following year.

== Distribution and habitat ==
It is native to Taiwan, a wide area of central and southern China including Hong Kong, and northern Vietnam, growing at low to moderate altitudes, mostly below 1,500 m (4,900 ft) but rarely up to 2,000 m (6,600 ft) above sea level.

== History ==
The species was once dominant in early Hong Kong and is the only pine native to the territory. In 1894, it was threatened by infestations of Masson pine caterpillar (Dendrolimus punctatus), whose outbreaks caused widespread defoliation and the death of many trees. The damage persisted until pesticide control measures were introduced in the 1950s.During the Second Sino-Japanese War and the Chinese Civil War, the species was extensively logged for fuel, leading to a further decline in its population. Post-war reforestation efforts prioritized the planting of Taiwan acacia (Acacia confusa), brisbane box (Lophostemon confertus), and slash pine (P. elliottii), which further diminished the presence of the native pine.

Around 1970s, (Note: Allen Zhang (2023) proposed that the event occurred between the 1960s and 1970s, while Richard Corlett placed it in the 1970s to 1980s. Both, however, agree that the timeframe is around 1970s.) the introduction of pinewood nematode from North America and pine-needle scale insect from Taiwan, together virtually eliminated the native P. massoniana in Hong Kong. The slash pine has since substituted P. massoniana, because it is resistant to the pests.

=== Fossil record ===
A fossil seed cone and several needles of P. massoniana have been described from the upper Miocene Wenshan flora, Yunnan, SW China. The fossils most resemble the variety P. massoniana var. hainanensis, which is a tropical montane thermophilic tree restricted to Hainan Island in southern China.

== Uses ==
The species is a common tree used in plantation forestry for replacing or compensating for the loss of the natural forest in southern China, owing to its tolerance of poor soils and drought conditions. Its rapid growth makes it a valuable source of timber, which is used for furniture, construction, and pulp production for paper.

Pine trees (Pinus) are the primary source of rosin, with P. massoniana being one of the principal species used for rosin production in China.

== Gallery of images ==
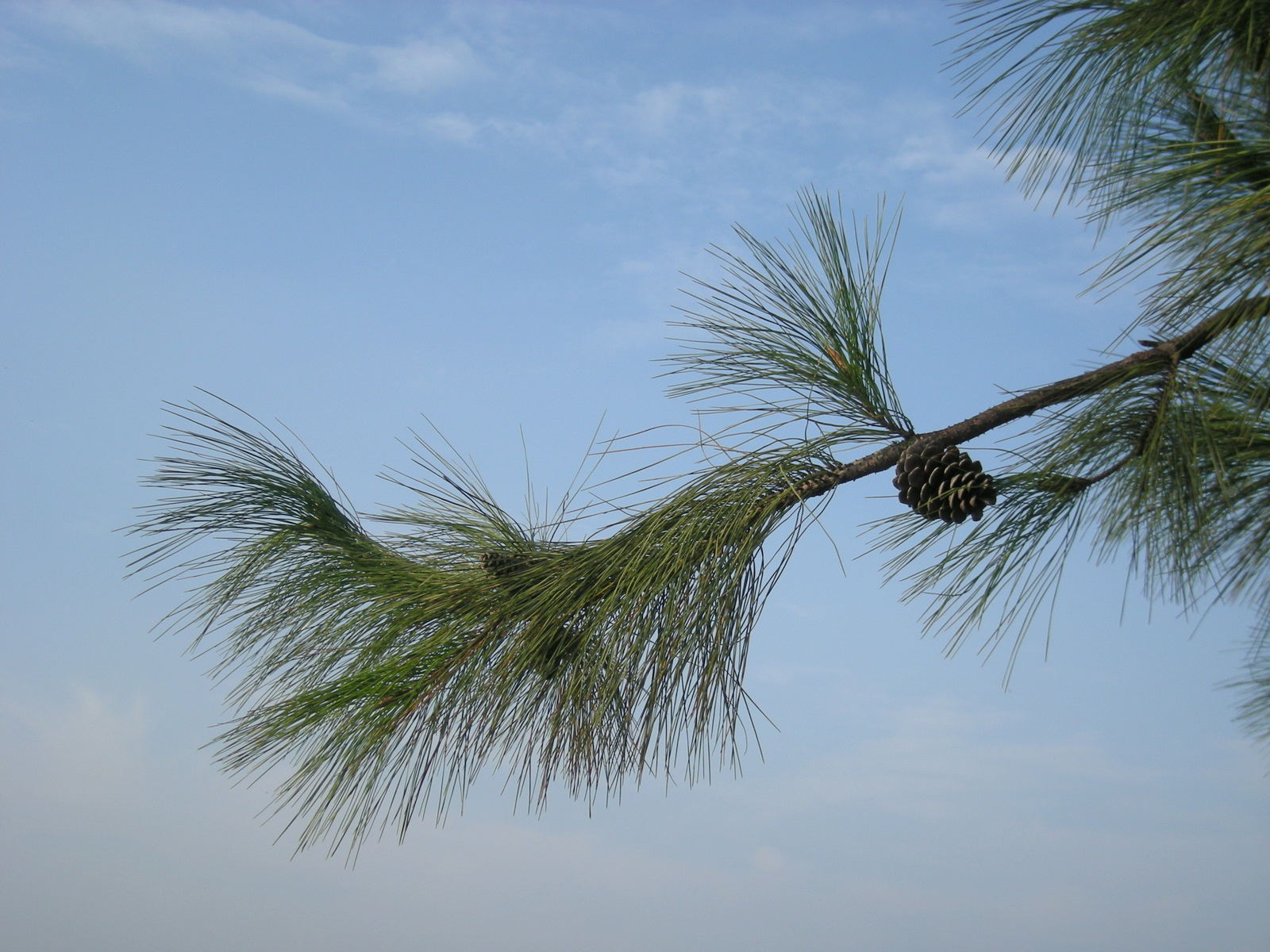

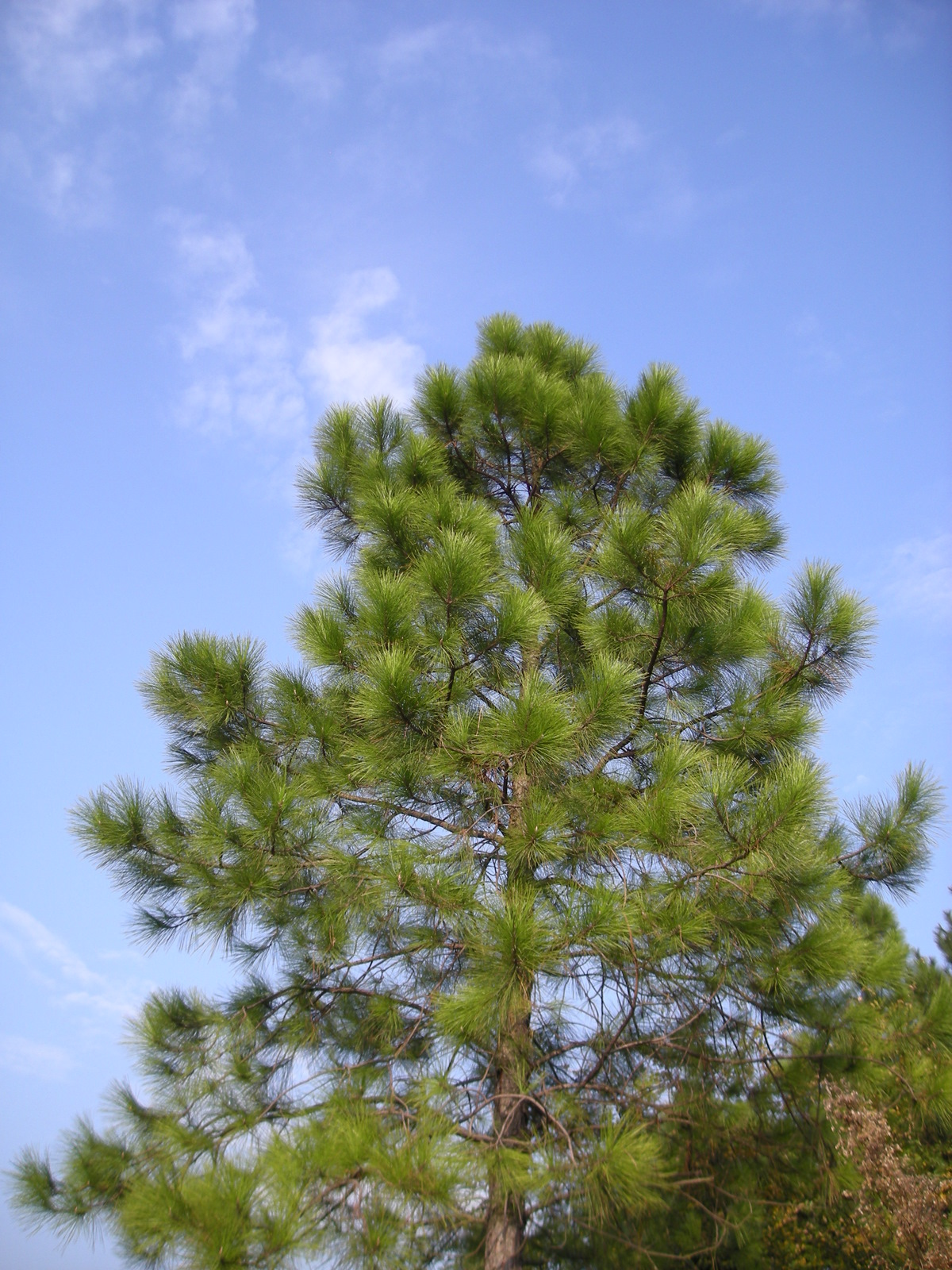

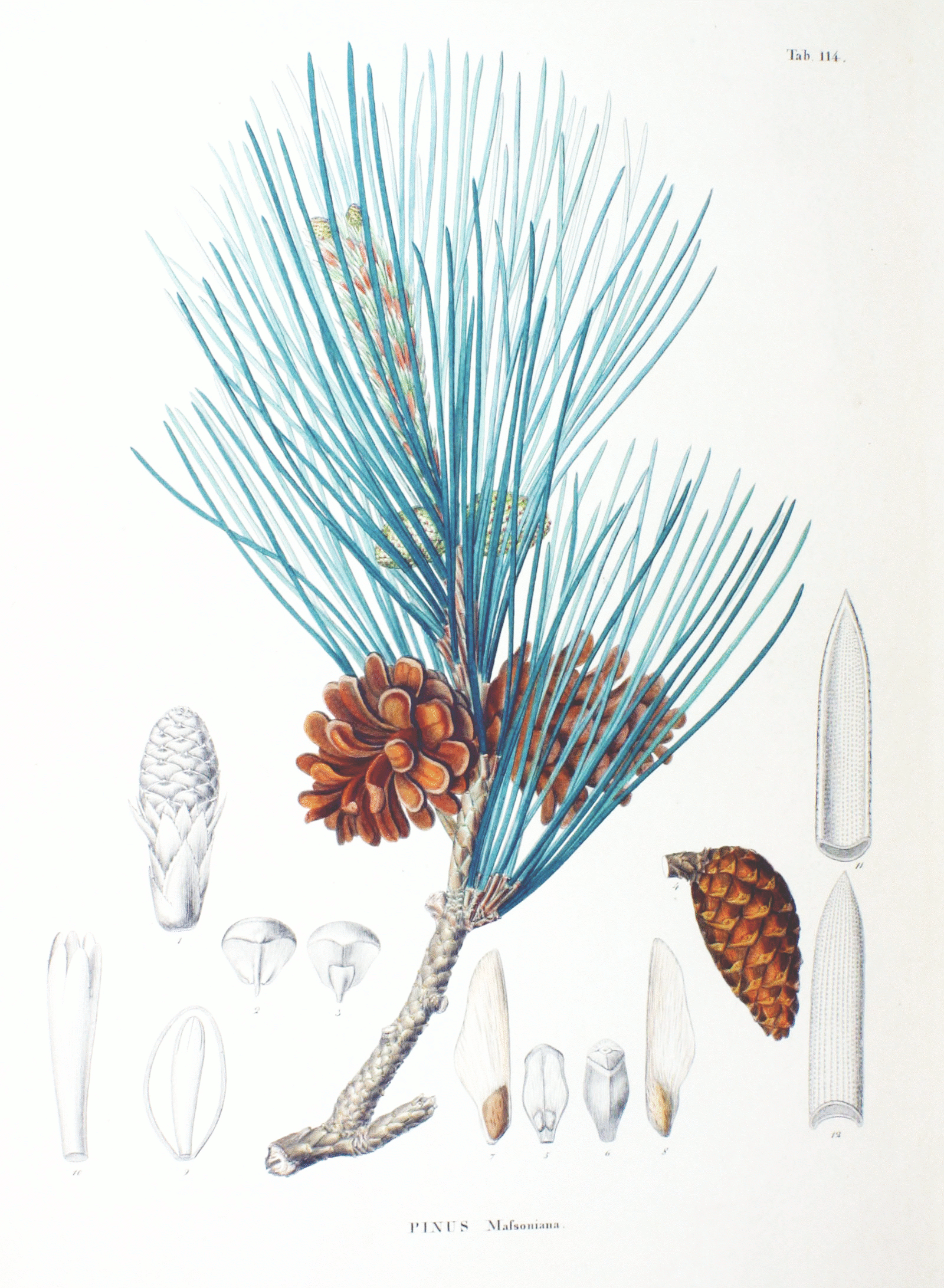

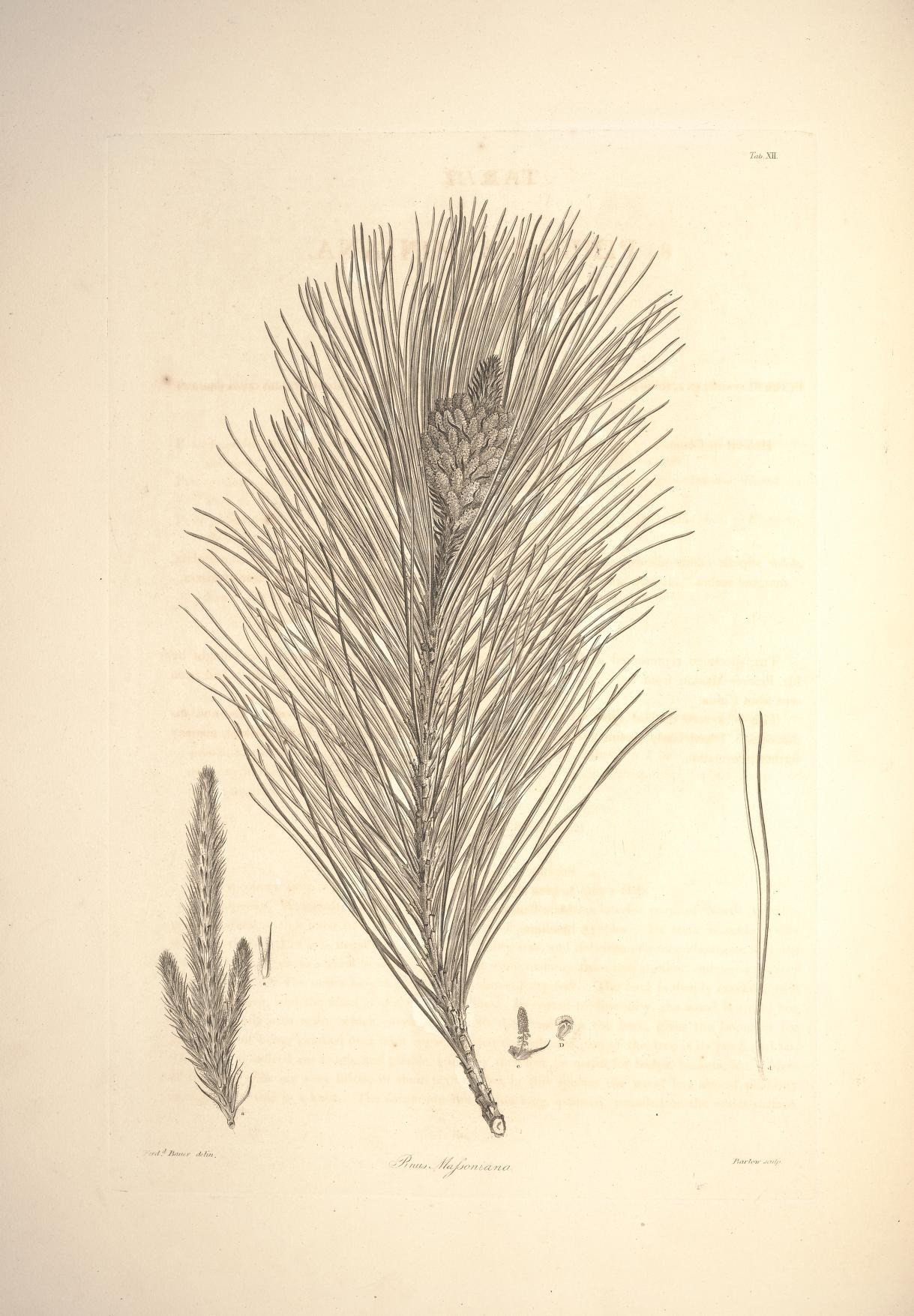
