= Asocainol =

Chemical compound

Clinical data
- ATC code: none

Identifiers
- IUPAC name: (+-)-6,7,8,9-tetrahydro-2,12-dimethoxy-7-methyl-6-phenethyl-5H-dibenz(d,f)azonine-1-ol
- CAS Number: 77400-65-8
- ChemSpider: 64302
- UNII: J40338OKKT
- ChEMBL: ChEMBL2104050
- CompTox Dashboard (EPA): DTXSID90868434

Chemical and physical data
- 3D model (JSmol): Interactive image
- SMILES: O(c3cc2c1c(O)c(OC)ccc1CC(N(CCc2cc3)C)CCc4ccccc4)C
- InChI: InChI=1S/C27H31NO3/c1-28-16-15-20-10-13-23(30-2)18-24(20)26-21(11-14-25(31-3)27(26)29)17-22(28)12-9-19-7-5-4-6-8-19/h4-8,10-11,13-14,18,22,29H,9,12,15-17H2,1-3H3; Key:IORHSKBXWWSQME-UHFFFAOYSA-N

Asocainol is a class 1a anti-arrhythmic compound.

== See also ==
- Protostephanine 549-28-0
