= Azoximer bromide =

Medication

Clinical data
- Other names: Polyoxidonium, Synpol
- ATC code: L03AX (WHO)

Pharmacokinetic data
- Bioavailability: up to 89%
- Elimination half-life: 25.4 hours (intravenous routes)

Identifiers
- IUPAC name: Poly[[1-(carboxymethyl)piperazin-1-ium-1,4-diyl bromide]ethylene- co-[(piperazin-1,4-diyl 1-oxide)ethylene]]
- CAS Number: 892497-01-7
- DrugBank: DB15689
- UNII: 90G53638ZD

Chemical and physical data
- Formula: [C_{8}H_{15}BrN_{2}O_{2}]_{x}[C_{6}H_{12}N_{2}O]_{y}]_{n}
- Molar mass: 60000–100000 g/mol

Azoximer bromide, sold by the trade name Polyoxidonium by Petrovax NPO, is a water-soluble cationic polymer, adjuvant for use with the hemagglutinin glycoprotein-based influenza vaccine Grippol. Azoximer bromide is a ternary copolymer of 1,4-ethylene piperazine, 1,4-ethylene piperazine-N-oxide, and (N-carboxymethylene)-1,4-ethylene piperazinium bromide with a molecular weight of 60–100 kDa. A derivative of poly(1,4-ethylene piperazine), it is synthesized by a partial oxidation of the parent polymer with hydrogen peroxide to introduce N-oxide groups followed by the quaternization of non-oxidized amino groups with bromoacetic acid.

Azoximer bromide is registered under US Patent-5503830 from 1996, and in the Russian Federation from 1996, under registration number 96/302/9, FS 42-3906-00. In Slovakia, azoximer bromide 6 mg lyophilisate for solution for injection has been authorized since 2002 for the treatment of diseases accompanied by secondary immunodeficiency in adults, including acute and recurrent infections, allergies, septic conditions, post-surgical complications and treatment-induced immune deficiency.

The clinical effectiveness of azoximer bromide has not been confirmed by independent clinical studies that meet modern standards of evidence-based medicine: there are few double-blind randomized and placebo-controlled studies with a sufficient number of participants and the publication of results in well-regarded scientific journals with high impact factors.

== History ==
Research conducted in the 1970s and 1980s targeted the potentiation of immune responses to infection through natural and synthetic polymeric compounds. The preliminary work leading to the discovery was published, but at the time it was generally accepted that Russian institutions would publish research in the Russian language in Russian scientific journals. It is produced by NPO Petrovax Pharm LLC.

Research at the Institute of Immunology ended following budget cuts associated with perestroika that were instituted across the Soviet Union by Mikhail Gorbachev in the 1980s. At the time, research on the lead compound azoximer bromide was well-advanced, with a range of pre-clinical and clinical studies having been conducted. Efforts were made to protect the intellectual property behind azoximer bromide during this time until a patent to support the clinical use of polymeric compounds with immune-stimulating activity could be applied for. This was awarded in 1996 and the team responsible for the development of azoximer bromide established the first native commercial pharmaceutical company (Petrovax NPO) under the leadership of Professor Arkady Nekrasov.

Researchers from the former Soviet bloc countries have continued to publish their work on azoximer bromide over the last two decades. However, most of these publications continue to be in Russian language journals. It is possible that isolation during the years of the Cold War has seen a divergence in the way that science is reported and Russian scientists have found it challenging to adjust to the strict requirements of modern publishing houses. Although modern search engines and databases can provide ready translations (of research abstracts at least) there is a certain bias against research published in Russian language. English remains the lingua franca of the biomedical sciences and access to full translations of research papers remains a challenge and, unlike the majority of international journals, most articles in Russian journals are hard to search and sources cannot be captured by citation management systems (they do not have special coding of article descriptors). Many Western research scientists continue to view research from Russia to be poor. This is not helped by too many publications being seen to be poor quality in terms of study design and statistical analysis.

== Medical uses ==
From the outset azoximer bromide was identified as an immune modulator drug that had the potential to increase a host's resistance to local and general infection. Currently, azoximer bromide it is indicated for the treatment of viral infections.

One of the first clinical applications of azoximer bromide was with the commercial influenza vaccine, in which azoximer bromide was covalently conjugated to antigenic components of the vaccine—hemagglutinin and neuraminidase. Several Grippol vaccines have been developed and approved based on a single technological platform that implements the principle of using the complex 'polymer adjuvant – pure antigens': Grippol, Grippol plus, pandemic MonoGrippol plus and Grippol Quadrivalent. Over the 20 years of use, these vaccines have proven to be safe and effective for adults, children and the elderly, according to an analysis of about 50 million recipients. All vaccines of the Grippol family have two common features: firstly, they contain a reduced dose of antigens, and secondly, they contain adjuvant azoximer bromide.

== Side effects ==
Polyoxidonium lyophilisate for solution for injection is well tolerated. No safety concerns were identified during clinical development and through routine post-authorization pharmacovigilance activities. Several published clinical studies reported no adverse reactions in patients treated with azoximer bromide who were suffering from various conditions, including bronchial asthma, chronic recurrent herpes simplex infections, pneumonia, pyelonephritis, recurrent urogenital chlamydial infections and atopic dermatitis. Where side effects have been reported they have included restlessness, fatigue, feeling hot/pyrexia and asthenia.

== Metabolism ==
As an N-oxidized polyethylene–piperazine derivative, the introduction of N-oxide groups is critically important as the optimal composition was selected in order to minimize toxicity, typically inherent to polyamines, and to maintain an appropriate level of immunostimulation. In addition, the N-oxide units in the backbone are capable of degradation at elevated temperatures rearranging to oximes and then to amine and aldehyde groups. As a result, the copolymer chains are cleaved to shorter fragments, which then can be released from the body.

== Pharmacology ==
Generally, it has long been known that polyelectrolytes—ionic macromolecules of either synthetic or natural origin—serve as immunostimulants when introduced as mixtures with typical antigens, thereby enhancing immune responses by several fold. An analysis of immunomodulating effect induced by azoximer bromide proved its stimulating activity on proinflammatory cytokines production in vitro, such as IL-1H, tumor necrosis factor (TNF)-α and IL-6.

In vitro studies demonstrated multiple effects of azoximer bromide, including an increase in degranulation of natural killer cells, an increase in T cell proliferation, and the expansion and maturation of dendritic cells with the expression of several co-stimulatory molecules. Azoximer bromide penetrates into the cell endosomal segment, where it is associated with increased micromolecular concentrations of hydrogen peroxide, an activator of some signaling molecules and transcription factors, in particular nuclear factor kappa B (NF-κB), having detoxifying and antioxidant properties.

A dose-dependent increase in the intracellular killing by blood phagocytes has also been observed for this polymer. In another study, it was established that azoximer bromide could affect the bactericidal activity of leukocytes. Many chronic infectious inflammatory diseases are characterized by a sluggish, recurrent course, resistant to adequate therapy and requiring additional immunostimulation. It was established that a 1-hour incubation of human peripheral blood leukocytes with azoximer bromide increased the ability of leukocytes to kill the ingested Staphylococcus aureus in a dose-dependent manner. This increase was observed with leukocytes obtained both from healthy persons and from patients with chronic granulomatous disease. Azoximer bromide has also demonstrated antioxidant activity at all dose range of 100 to 500 μg/mL. Azoximer bromide displayed ability to enhance immune responses to the live brucellosis vaccine, Brucella abortus strain 82-PS (penicillin sensitive) in a guinea pig model.

== Clinical trials ==
The efficacy and safety of azoximer bromide has been assessed in patients with various diseases accompanied by secondary immunodeficiency, including acute and recurrent infections and allergic conditions. More than 17 clinical trials and 73 clinical research studies enrolling over 5,000 patients in total have been performed across a variety of indications. In a clinical study azoximer bromide was evaluated with the trivalent live attenuated measles, mumps and rubella vaccine. Although findings indicate that healthy children needed no fortification of their immune responses on the vaccination, as they can produce a high level of specific antibodies, children with previous exposure to harmful factors affecting normal T-cell content (viral and other diseases) may benefit from the use of azoximer bromide. However, authors also note that the detected increase in TNF-β level and skewing the dominant immune responses from Th1 to Th2 type could not be appreciated as positive effect of azoximer bromide in this environment.
