= Azabon =

Chemical compound

Identifiers
- IUPAC name: 4-(3-Azabicyclo[3.2.2]non-3-ylsulfonyl)aniline
- CAS Number: 1150-20-5
- PubChem CID: 14380
- ChemSpider: 13739
- UNII: 4IYS7OKE05
- KEGG: D03019
- ChEMBL: ChEMBL2103973
- CompTox Dashboard (EPA): DTXSID70150925

Chemical and physical data
- Formula: C_{14}H_{20}N_{2}O_{2}S
- Molar mass: 280.386
- 3D model (JSmol): Interactive image
- SMILES: c1cc(ccc1N)S(=O)(=O)N2CC3CCC(C2)CC3
- InChI: InChI=1S/C14H20N2O2S/c15-13-5-7-14(8-6-13)19(17,18)16-9-11-1-2-12(10-16)4-3-11/h5-8,11-12H,1-4,9-10,15H2; Key:RQBNXPJPWKUTOG-UHFFFAOYSA-N; InChI=1/C14H20N2O2S/c15-13-5-7-14(8-6-13)19(17,18)16-9-11-1-2-12(10-16)4-3-11/h5-8,11-12H,1-4,9-10,15H2; Key:RQBNXPJPWKUTOG-UHFFFAOYAL

Azabon is a central nervous system stimulant of the sulfonamide class that is also used as a nootropic. It has poor antibacterial potency, as is common in benzenesulfonamides with two substituents on N_{1}. It is synthesized from 3-azabicyclo-[2.2.2]nonane, itself prepared by pyrolysis of aliphatic diamine.
