= Atorolimumab =

Chemical compound

Monoclonal antibody
- Type: Whole antibody
- Source: Human
- Target: RhD

Clinical data
- ATC code: none

Identifiers
- CAS Number: 202833-08-7
- ChemSpider: none
- UNII: ZT2TX7WZL7

Atorolimumab is an immunosuppressive drug directed against the Rhesus factor.
