= Azaloxan =

Chemical compound

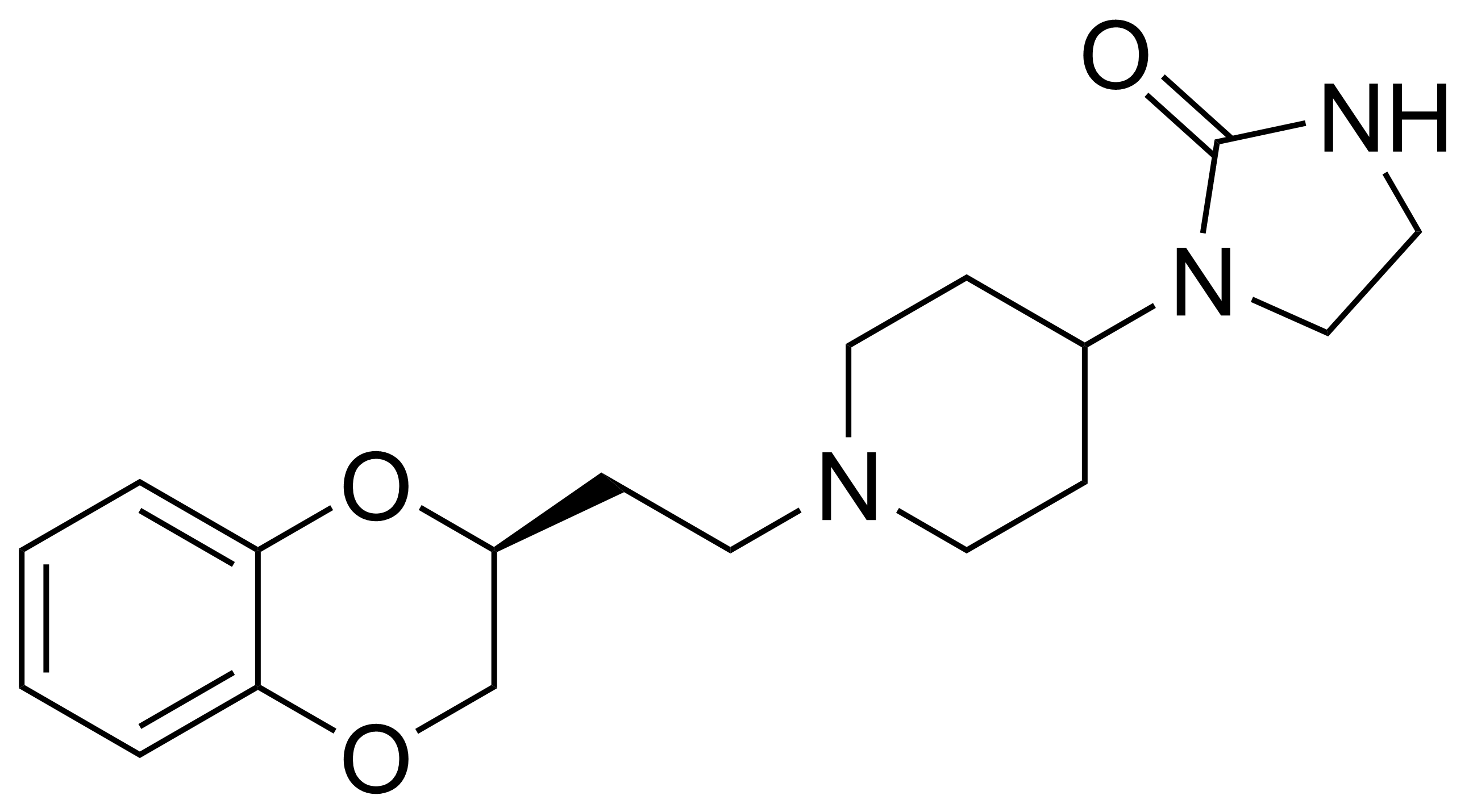

Clinical data
- ATC code: None

Identifiers
- IUPAC name: 1-(1-{2-[(2S)-2,3-dihydro-1,4-benzodioxin-2-yl]ethyl}piperidin-4-yl)imidazolidin-2-one
- CAS Number: 72822-56-1 86116-60-1 (fumarate)
- PubChem CID: 6328465
- ChemSpider: 4886586
- UNII: 0O653FA999
- ChEMBL: ChEMBL2104648
- CompTox Dashboard (EPA): DTXSID10993616

Chemical and physical data
- Formula: C_{18}H_{25}N_{3}O_{3}
- Molar mass: 331.416 g·mol^{−1}
- 3D model (JSmol): Interactive image
- SMILES: O=C1NCCN1C2CCN(CC2)CC[C@@H]3Oc4c(OC3)cccc4
- InChI: InChI=1S/C18H25N3O3/c22-18-19-8-12-21(18)14-5-9-20(10-6-14)11-7-15-13-23-16-3-1-2-4-17(16)24-15/h1-4,14-15H,5-13H2,(H,19,22)/t15-/m0/s1; Key:CDFTVVPIMLXJRX-HNNXBMFYSA-N

Azaloxan (CGS-7135A) is a drug which was patented as an antidepressant by Ciba-Geigy in the early 1980s, but was never marketed. It has been described as a psychostimulant.

== Synthesis ==
Azaloxan synthesis

The halogenation of allyl cyanide (1) with bromine gives 3,4-dibromobutyronitrile (2). This is further reacted with catechol (3) to give the 1,4-benzodioxan-2-yl-acetonitrile (4). Acid catalyzed hydrolysis of the nitrile to the acid gives 1,4-benzodioxan-2-yl-acetic acid (5). The reduction of this to alcohol with sodium bis(2-methoxyethoxy)aluminium hydride gives 2-(1,4-benzodioxan-2-yl)ethanol (6). The tosylation of this compound gives the intermediate 7. Lastly, an S_{N}2 displacement reaction with 1-(4-piperidinyl)-2-imidazolidinone (8) completes the synthesis of azaloxan (9).

== See also ==
- Idazoxan
- Piperoxan
