= 2-Methylsuccinic acid =

Names
- Preferred IUPAC name Methylbutanedioic acid
- Other names Pyrotartaric acid; 2-Methylbutanedioic acid; Propane-1,2-dicarboxylic acid

Identifiers
| CAS Number | 498-21-5 |
| 3D model (JSmol) | Interactive image |
| ChEBI | CHEBI:91315 |
| ChemSpider | 9922 |
| ECHA InfoCard | 100.007.144 |
| EC Number | 207-857-1 |
| PubChem CID | 10349 |
| UNII | H1547KG7UZ |
| CompTox Dashboard (EPA) | DTXSID9025663 |
- InChI: InChI=1S/C5H8O4/c1-3(5(8)9)2-4(6)7/h3H,2H2,1H3,(H,6,7)(H,8,9) Key: WXUAQHNMJWJLTG-UHFFFAOYSA-N
- SMILES: CC(CC(=O)O)C(=O)O

Properties
| Chemical formula | C_{5}H_{8}O_{4} |
| Molar mass | 132.115 g·mol^{−1} |
| Appearance | White solid |
| Melting point | 117.5 °C (243.5 °F; 390.6 K) |

Hazards
- GHS labelling
| Pictograms | (GHS07: Exclamation mark) |
| Signal word | Warning |
| Hazard statements | H315, H319, H335 |
| Precautionary statements | P261, P264, P271, P280, P302+P352, P304+P340, P305+P351+P338, P312, P321, P332+P313, P337+P313, P362, P403+P233, P405, P501 |
- Except where otherwise noted, data are given for materials in their standard state (at 25 °C [77 °F], 100 kPa). Infobox references

2-Methylsuccinic acid is an organic compound with the formula HO_{2}CCH(CH_{3})CH_{2}CO_{2}H. A white solid, it is the simplest chiral dicarboxylic acid. It is a recurring component of urban aerosols. Salts and esters of 2-methylsuccinic acid are called 2-methylsuccinates.

== Preparation ==
It can be prepared by partial hydrogenation of itaconic acid over Raney nickel. Alternatively, hydrocyanation of ethyl crotonate affords an intermediate, which converts to 2-methylsuccinic acid after hydrolysis of the ester and nitrile substituents.
