= Aselizumab =

Chemical compound

Monoclonal antibody
- Type: Whole antibody
- Source: Humanized (from mouse)
- Target: CD62L

Clinical data
- ATC code: none

Identifiers
- CAS Number: 395639-53-9
- ChemSpider: none
- UNII: 8Y539D78FU

Aselizumab is an immunosuppressive drug which has been investigated for the use in severely injured patients. It binds to CD62L.
