= Azipramine =

Chemical compound

Clinical data
- ATC code: None

Identifiers
- IUPAC name: N-Benzyl-2-(6,7-dihydroindolo[1,7-ab][1]benzazepin-1-yl)-N-methylethanamine
- CAS Number: 58503-82-5 57529-83-6 (HCl)
- PubChem CID: 65468
- ChemSpider: 58920
- UNII: 1P9L1B4UIC
- ChEMBL: ChEMBL2105908
- CompTox Dashboard (EPA): DTXSID10974061

Chemical and physical data
- Formula: C_{26}H_{26}N_{2}
- Molar mass: 366.508 g·mol^{−1}
- 3D model (JSmol): Interactive image
- SMILES: c15ccccc1n3c2c(cccc2cc3CCN(Cc4ccccc4)C)CC5
- InChI: InChI=1S/C26H26N2/c1-27(19-20-8-3-2-4-9-20)17-16-24-18-23-12-7-11-22-15-14-21-10-5-6-13-25(21)28(24)26(22)23/h2-13,18H,14-17,19H2,1H3; Key:GMJAPDJBIOQXSW-UHFFFAOYSA-N

Azipramine (TQ-86) is a tetracyclic antidepressant (TeCA) which was synthesized and assayed pharmacologically in animals in 1976, but was never marketed.
