= Azosemide =

Chemical compound

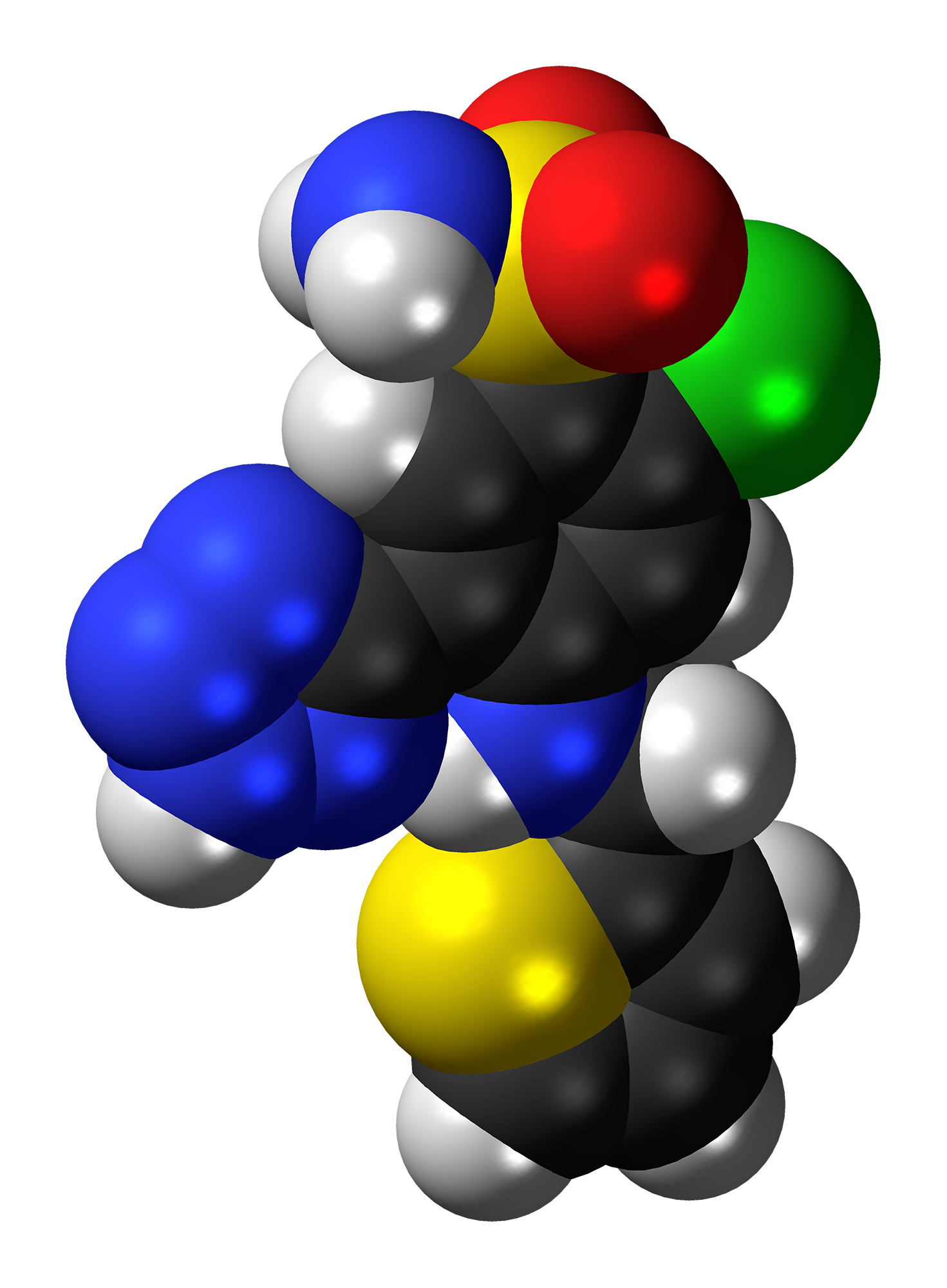

Clinical data
- AHFS/Drugs.com: International Drug Names
- ATC code: none

Identifiers
- IUPAC name: 2-chloro-5-(2H-tetrazol-5-yl)-4-[(thiophen-2-ylmethyl)amino]benzenesulfonamide
- CAS Number: 27589-33-9
- PubChem CID: 2273
- DrugBank: DB08961
- ChemSpider: 2186
- UNII: MR40VT1L8Z
- KEGG: D01323
- ChEBI: CHEBI:31248
- ChEMBL: ChEMBL1097235
- CompTox Dashboard (EPA): DTXSID7046910
- ECHA InfoCard: 100.044.121

Chemical and physical data
- Formula: C_{12}H_{11}ClN_{6}O_{2}S_{2}
- Molar mass: 370.83 g·mol^{−1}
- 3D model (JSmol): Interactive image
- SMILES: O=S(=O)(N)c2c(Cl)cc(c(c1n[nH]nn1)c2)NCc3sccc3
- InChI: InChI=1S/C12H11ClN6O2S2/c13-9-5-10(15-6-7-2-1-3-22-7)8(12-16-18-19-17-12)4-11(9)23(14,20)21/h1-5,15H,6H2,(H2,14,20,21)(H,16,17,18,19); Key:HMEDEBAJARCKCT-UHFFFAOYSA-N

Azosemide is a high-ceiling loop diuretic agent that was brought to market in 1981 by Boehringer Mannheim. As of 2015 it was available as a generic in some Asian countries.

Azosemide has been found as an adulterant in ketamine.
