= Thenyldiamine =

Chemical compound

Clinical data
- ATC code: none

Identifiers
- IUPAC name: N,N-Dimethyl-N′-pyridin-2-yl-N'-(3-thienylmethyl)ethane-1,2-diamine
- CAS Number: 91-79-2
- PubChem CID: 7066
- ChemSpider: 6799
- UNII: E4U52363JE
- CompTox Dashboard (EPA): DTXSID0021335
- ECHA InfoCard: 100.001.908

Chemical and physical data
- Formula: C_{14}H_{19}N_{3}S
- Molar mass: 261.39 g·mol^{−1}
- 3D model (JSmol): Interactive image
- SMILES: CN(C)CCN(CC1=CSC=C1)C2=CC=CC=N2
- InChI: InChI=1S/C14H19N3S/c1-16(2)8-9-17(11-13-6-10-18-12-13)14-5-3-4-7-15-14/h3-7,10,12H,8-9,11H2,1-2H3; Key:RCGYDFVCAAKKNG-UHFFFAOYSA-N

Thenyldiamine is an antihistamine and anticholinergic.
