= Atibeprone =

Chemical compound

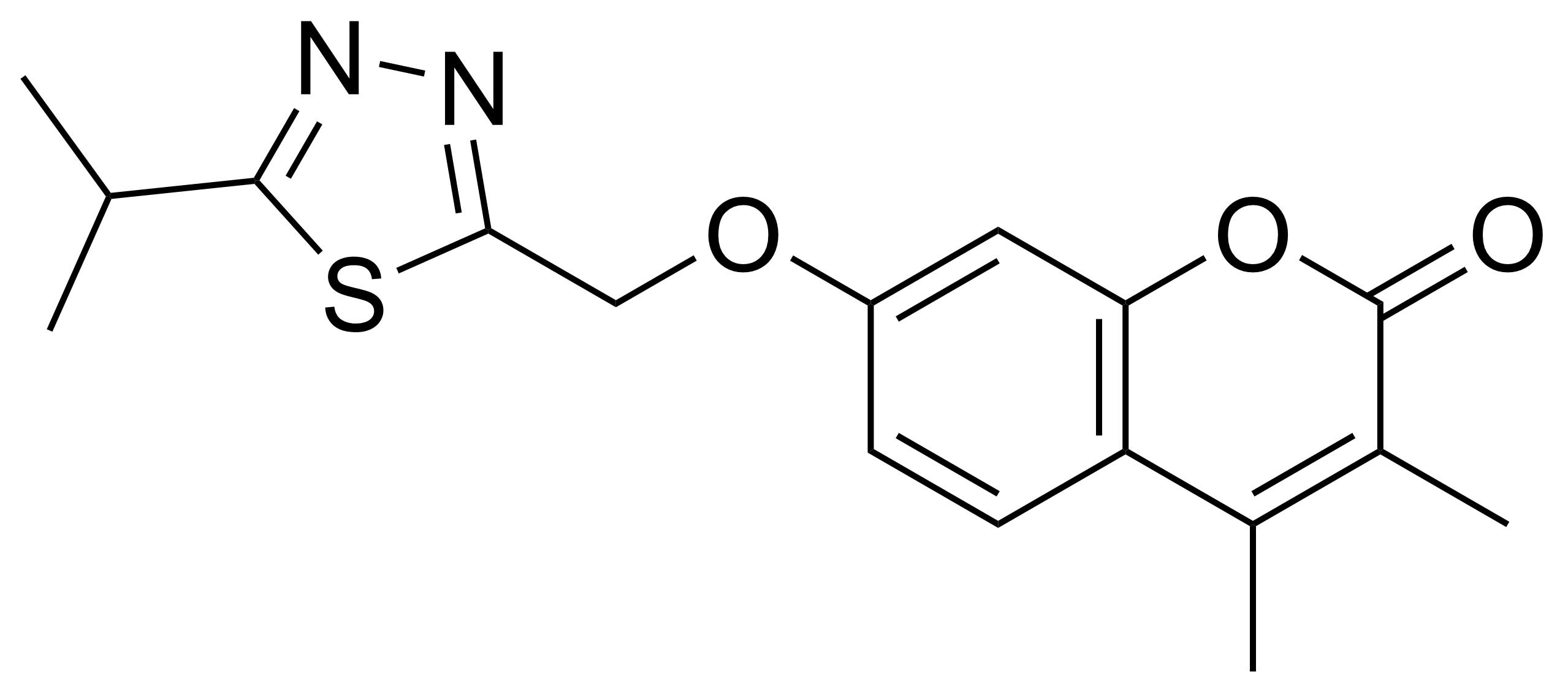

Clinical data
- ATC code: None

Identifiers
- IUPAC name: 3,4-dimethyl-7-{[5-(propan-2-yl)-1,3,4-thiadiazol-2-yl]methoxy}-2H-chromen-2-one
- CAS Number: 153420-96-3
- PubChem CID: 179342
- ChemSpider: 156109
- UNII: PZV3P03F1U
- ChEMBL: ChEMBL19004
- CompTox Dashboard (EPA): DTXSID00165325

Chemical and physical data
- Formula: C_{17}H_{18}N_{2}O_{3}S
- Molar mass: 330.40 g·mol^{−1}
- 3D model (JSmol): Interactive image
- SMILES: O=C/2Oc3cc(OCc1nnc(s1)C(C)C)ccc3\C(=C\2C)C
- InChI: InChI=1S/C17H18N2O3S/c1-9(2)16-19-18-15(23-16)8-21-12-5-6-13-10(3)11(4)17(20)22-14(13)7-12/h5-7,9H,8H2,1-4H3; Key:HQTNJPCZUQAYAB-UHFFFAOYSA-N

Atibeprone is an antidepressant which was developed in the mid-1990s, but was never marketed.
