= Axomadol =

Chemical compound

Clinical data
- ATC code: None

Legal status
- Legal status: US: ?

Identifiers
- IUPAC name: (1R,3R,6R)-6-[(dimethylamino)methyl]-1-(3-methoxyphenyl)-1,3-cyclohexanediol
- CAS Number: 187219-95-0 187219-99-4
- PubChem CID: 10221318
- ChemSpider: 8396810
- UNII: B77S5W28H9
- CompTox Dashboard (EPA): DTXSID10171992

Chemical and physical data
- Formula: C_{16}H_{25}NO_{3}
- Molar mass: 279.380 g·mol^{−1}
- 3D model (JSmol): Interactive image
- SMILES: O[C@]2(c1cc(OC)ccc1)C[C@H](O)CC[C@@H]2CN(C)C
- InChI: InChI=1S/C16H25NO3/c1-17(2)11-13-7-8-14(18)10-16(13,19)12-5-4-6-15(9-12)20-3/h4-6,9,13-14,18-19H,7-8,10-11H2,1-3H3/t13-,14-,16+/m1/s1; Key:LQJLLAOISDVBJM-FMKPAKJESA-N

Axomadol (INN, USAN) (code name EN3324) is a synthetic, centrally-acting opioid analgesic related to tramadol which was under investigation by Endo Pharmaceuticals in collaboration with Grünenthal GmbH for the treatment of chronic, moderate to severe lower back pain and arthrosis. Development was halted after phase II clinical trials as it did not meet the pre-determined clinical endpoints.

== See also ==
- Tramadol
