= Morantel =

Names
- Preferred IUPAC name 1-Methyl-2-[(E)-2-(3-methylthiophen-2-yl)ethen-1-yl]-1,4,5,6-tetrahydropyrimidine
- Other names Morantel tartrate; Paratect

Identifiers
CAS Number	20574-50-9
3D model (JSmol)	Interactive image
ChEBI	CHEBI:94736
ChEMBL	ChEMBL1240978
ChemSpider	4101
ECHA InfoCard	100.039.885
EC Number	243-890-8
KEGG	C08230
PubChem CID	5353792
UNII	7NJ031HAX5
CompTox Dashboard (EPA)	DTXSID9048562
- InChI: InChI=1S/C12H16N2S/c1-10-6-9-15-11(10)4-5-12-13-7-3-8-14(12)2/h4-6,9H,3,7-8H2,1-2H3/b5-4+ Key: NVEPPWDVLBMNMB-SNAWJCMRSA-N
- SMILES: CC1=C(SC=C1)C=CC2=NCCCN2C

Properties
Chemical formula	C_{12}H_{16}N_{2}S
Molar mass	220.33 g·mol^{−1}
- Except where otherwise noted, data are given for materials in their standard state (at 25 °C [77 °F], 100 kPa). Infobox references

Morantel is an anthelmintic drug used for the removal of parasitic worms in livestock. It affects the nervous system of worms given the drug is an inhibitor of acetylcholinesterase. It is derived in part from 3-methylthiophene. Morantel is closely related to pyrantel.
