= Azficel-T =

Medication for nasolabial fold wrinkles

Clinical data
- Trade names: Laviv
- AHFS/Drugs.com: Micromedex Detailed Consumer Information
- Routes of administration: Intradermal
- ATC code: None

Legal status
- Legal status: US: ℞-only

Identifiers
- DrugBank: DB11051
- UNII: 022461SR75
- KEGG: D10057

Azficel-T, sold under the brand name Laviv, is a cell therapy product used to treat moderate to severe nasolabial fold wrinkles (the lines running from the sides of the nose to the corners of the mouth) in adults.

The treatment is autologous, meaning it uses the patient’s own cells. Specifically, fibroblasts—cells involved in skin structure and repair—are extracted from a small skin sample, cultured in a laboratory to increase their number, and then re-injected into the patient’s skin to improve appearance.

Azficel-T was approved for medical use in the United States in June 2011.
