= List of drugs: Al =

This multi-page article lists pharmaceutical drugs alphabetically by name. Many drugs have more than one name and, therefore, the same drug may be listed more than once. Brand names and generic names are differentiated by capitalizing brand names.

See also the list of the top 100 bestselling branded drugs, ranked by sales.

Abbreviations are used in the list as follows:

- INN = International nonproprietary name
- BAN = British Approved Name
- USAN = United States Adopted Name
- Two-letter codes for countries

Lists of drugs
1–9 | A | B | C | D | E | F | G | H | I | J | K | L | M | N | O | P | Q | R | S | T | U | V | W | X | Y | Z

Aa–Ab | Ac | Ad–Ak | Al | Am | An–Ap | Aq–Ar | As–Az

== ala-alb ==
- Ala-Cort
- Ala-Quin
- Ala-Scalp
- Ala-Tet
- alacepril (INN)
- alacizumab pegol (INN)
- alafosfalin (INN)
- alagebrium chloride (USAN)
- Alamast
- alanine (INN)
- alanosine (INN)
- alaproclate (INN)
- alatrofloxacin (INN)
- Alavert
- alazanine triclofenate (INN)
- albaconazole (USAN)
- Albalon
- Albamycin
- albendazole oxide (INN)
- albendazole (INN)
- Albenza
- Albert Tiafen
- albifylline (INN)
- albiglutide (USAN)
- albinterferon alfa-2B (USAN, INN)
- albitiazolium bromide (INN)
- albuglutide (INN)
- Albuminar
- Albunex
- Albutein
- albuterol (INN)
- albutoin (INN)

== alc-ale ==
- alcaftadine (USAN, INN)
- Alcaine
- Alcalak
- alclofenac (INN)
- alclometasone (INN)
- alcloxa (INN)
- alcohol, the type known as ethanol
- Alcomicin
- Alconefrinasal Solution
- alcuronium chloride (INN)
- Aldactazide
- Aldactone
- Aldara
- aldesleukin (INN)
- aldesulfone sodium (INN)
- aldioxa (INN)
- Aldoclor
- Aldomet
- Aldoril
- aldosterone (INN)
- Aldurazyme
- Alecensa
- alefacept (USAN)
- aleglitazar (USAN, INN)
- alemtuzumab (INN)
- alendronic acid (INN)
- alentemol (INN)
- aleplasinin (USAN, INN)
- alepride (INN)
- Aler-Dryl
- Alertec
- Alesse
- alestramustine (INN)
- Aleve
- alexidine (INN)
- alexitol sodium (INN)

== alf-alh ==
- alfacalcidol (INN)
- alfadex (INN)
- alfadolone (INN)
- alfaprostol (INN)
- alfaxalone (INN)
- Alfenta (Taylor) redirects to alfentanil
- alfentanil (INN)
- alferminogene tadenovec (USAN, INN)
- Alferon
- alfetamine (INN)
- alfimeprase (USAN)
- alfuzosin (INN)
- algeldrate (INN)
- algenpantucel-L (USAN)
- algestone (INN)
- alglucerase (INN)
- alglucosidase alfa (USAN)
- Alhemo

== ali-alk ==
- alibendol (INN)
- alicaforsen (INN, USAN)
- aliconazole (INN)
- alifedrine (INN)
- aliflurane (INN)
- alimadol (INN)
- alimemazine (INN)
- Alimta (Eli Lilly and Company)
- alinastine (INN)
- Alinia (Romark Laboratories)
- alinidine (INN)
- alipamide (INN)
- alipogene tiparvovec (INN)
- alisertib (INN, USAN)
- aliskiren (USAN)
- alisporivir INN, USAN)
- alitretinoin (INN)
- alizapride (INN)
- Alka-Mints (Bayer)
- Alka-Seltzer (Bayer)
- Alkeran (GlaxoSmithKline)
- Alkergot (Sandoz)

== all ==
- Allay (Ivax Pharmaceuticals) mixture of hydrocodone and paracetamol
- Allegra-D (Sanofi-Aventis) mixture of fexofenadine and pseudoephedrine
- Allegra (Sanofi-Aventis), also known as fexofenadine
- Aller-Chlor
- Allercon Tablet
- Allerdryl (Valeant Pharmaceuticals)
- Allerfed
- AllerMax
- Allernix
- Allerphed
- Allersol
- Alli (GlaxoSmithKline)
- alletorphine (INN)
- allobarbital (INN)
- alloclamide (INN)
- Allocord
- allocupreide sodium (INN)
- allomethadione (INN)
- allopurinol (INN)
- allylestrenol (INN)
- allylprodine (INN)
- allylthiourea (INN)

== alm-aln ==
- almadrate sulfate (INN)
- almagate (INN)
- almagodrate amcinonide (INN)
- almasilate (INN)
- almecillin (INN)
- almestrone (INN)
- alminoprofen (INN)
- almitrine (INN)
- almokalant (INN)
- almorexant INN
- almotriptan (INN)
- almoxatone (INN)
- almurtide (INN)
- alnespirone (INN)
- alniditan (INN)

== alo ==
- Alocril
- alogliptin (USAN, INN)
- Alomide
- alonacic (INN)
- alonimid (INN)
- Alophen
- Aloprim
- Alora
- aloracetam (INN)
- alosetron (INN)
- alovudine (INN)
- Aloxi
- aloxiprin (INN)
- aloxistatin (INN)
- alozafone (INN)

== alp-als ==
- alpertine (INN)
- Alpha Chymar
- Alphacaine
- alphacetylmethadol (INN)
- Alphaderm
- Alphadrol
- alphafilcon A (USAN)
- Alphagan
- Alphalin
- alphameprodine (INN)
- alphamethadol (INN)
- Alphamul
- Alphanate
- AlphaNine SD
- alphaprodine (INN)
- Alphaquin HP
- Alpharedisol
- Alphatrex
- Alphazine
- alpidem (INN)
- alpiropride (INN)
- alprafenone (INN)
- alprazolam (INN)
- alprenolol (INN)
- alprostadil (INN)
- alrestatin (INN)
- Alrex
- alsactide (INN)

== alt-aly ==
- Altace (Pfizer/Sanofi-Aventis)
- Altamist
- altanserin (INN)
- altapizone (INN)
- Altebrel (INN)
- alteconazole (INN)
- alteplase (INN)
- Altinac
- altinicline (INN)
- altizide (INN)
- Altocor
- altoqualine (INN)
- altrenogest (INN)
- altretamine (INN)
- altumomab (INN)
- Altuviiio
- Alu-Cap
- Alu-Tab
- Aludrox
- aluminium clofibrate (INN)
- Alupent (Boehringer Ingelheim)
- Alustra
- alusulf (INN)
- alvameline maleate (USAN)
- alvelestat (INN)
- alverine (INN)
- alvespimycin (USAN, INN)
- alvimopan (USAN)
- alvircept sudotox (INN)
- alvocidib (INN)
- Alyftrek
- Alyglo
- Alymsys
