= C12H12 =

The molecular formula C_{12}H_{12} may refer to one of many molecules, including:

- Dodecaheptaene, a straight-chain polyene
- Cyclododecahexaene ([12]annulene)
- Cyclododecatriyne
- [6]Radialene(hexaradialene)
- Ten dimethylnaphthalene isomers, including:
  - 1,4-Dimethylnaphthalene
  - 2,6-Dimethylnaphthalene
- Two ethylnapthalene isomers
- 16 dimethylazulene isomers
- Five ethylazulene isomers
- Trivinylbenzene
- Tricyclobutabenzene
- [6]Prismane (hexaprismane)
