= Carboxylate-based metal–organic frameworks =

Carboxylate–based metal–organic frameworks are metal–organic frameworks that are based on organic molecules comprising carboxylate functional groups.

== Dicarboxylates ==
Interest in Metal-Organic Frameworks accelerated after 2000, when Omar M. Yaghi and his colleagues reported the synthesis and properties of certain nanoporous polycarboxylate salts of multivalent metals (see Figure below).

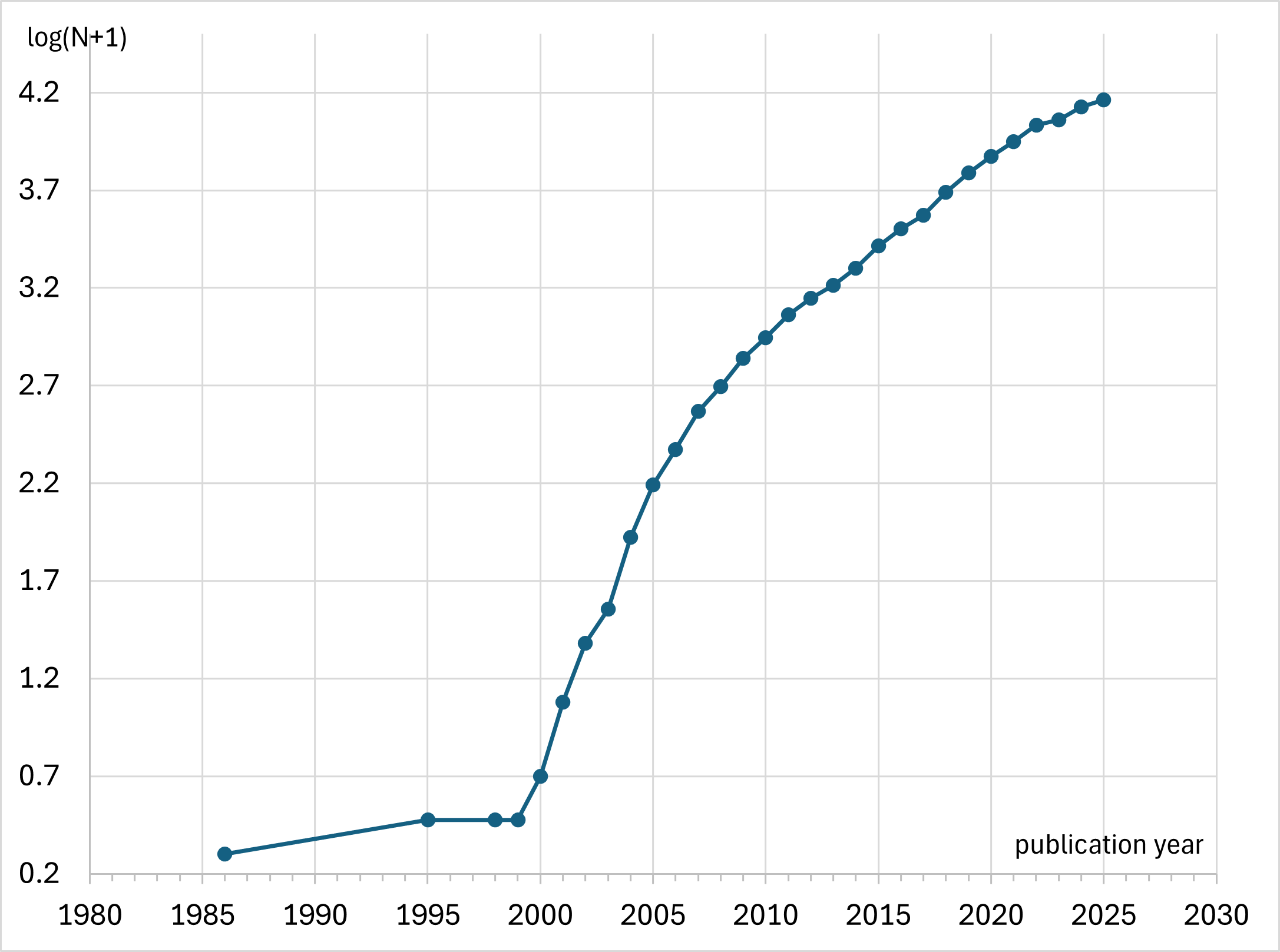
The number of publications about Metal Organic Frameworks by year.

The divalent metal carboxylate based frameworks MOF-5 and HKUST-1 are examples of prototypical MOF materials and triggered a significant growth in the field of metal-organic frameworks. A keyword search for “metal-organic frameworks” registers>1,600 publications in 2010 and >2,000 for 2011, an indication of the worldwide interest in this area and indicates that the growth is continuing.

=== MOF-5 & MOF-177 ===
MOF-5 is an early and heavily studied example of a MOF material. The material is an example of a cubic 3-dimensional extended lattice composed of Zn_{4}O inorganic clusters connected by terephthalate linkers. Each cluster involves 6 carboxylate groups of 6 terephthalate molecules bridging zinc atoms leading to an octahedral type arrangement around the cluster which, when expanded in three dimensions, reproduces the cubic arrangement of the material. The structure is retained upon solvent removal and the literature states that the Langmuir surface area (a monolayer-equivalent surface area) is stated to be of the order of 3000 m^{2}/g, significantly higher than that of most zeolites and at the time, among the highest of all known materials. One downside to the large open pore structure is the potential for interpenetration of 2 frameworks. In the case of MOF-5 and the IRMOF family of isoreticular structures, if the pore size is sufficient to contain a Zn_{4}O cluster and the dicarboxylate is of sufficient length, then the formation of a second extended lattice can occur within the first. This interpenetration or catenation of two frameworks results in a significant reduction in the porosity as the majority of the void space in the cage is filled with the other framework. Examples of interpenetration are reported for some members of the IRMOF series.

MOF-177 is another example of a MOF material containing the tetrahedral Zn_{4}O cluster but with a more complex and extended tricarboxylate linker. The carboxylate molecule in this case in the large BTB molecule (BTB = benzene-1,3,5-tricarboxylic acid (Trimesic acid)). This large yet rigid tri-carboxylate unit connects to the cluster in the same manner as in the MOF-5 structure but as there are three carboxylate units and a triangular geometry, this produces a more spherical porous cage structure rather than the cubic pore geometry in MOF-5. MOF-177 has been shown to have one of the largest surface areas of known materials to date. Literature states a Langmuir surface area value of 4500 m^{2}/g with N_{2} adsorption giving a type I isotherm with adsorption of 1350 mg/g between 0.4 and 1 P/(0.50 P) These values show that MOF-177 is a highly porous open framework MOF material with a 3-dimensionally connected array of porous cages.

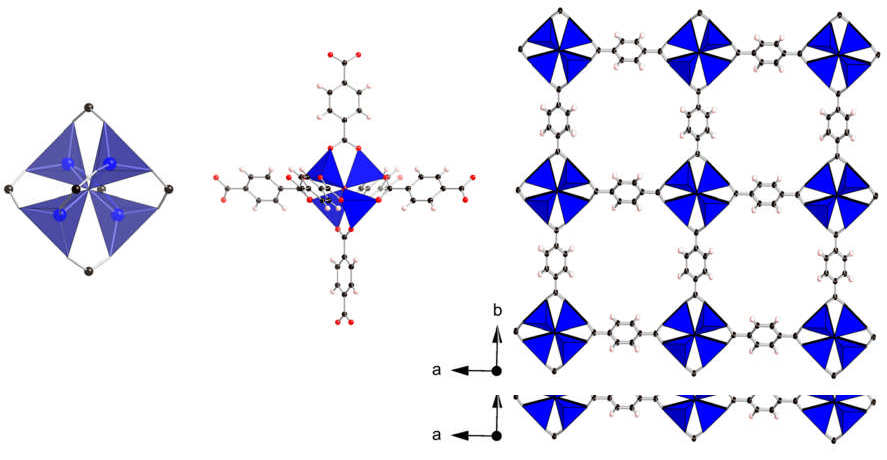
MOF-5 assembly, Zn_{4}O(CO_{2})_{6} cluster (left), octahedral geometry of terephthalate molecules (middle) and 3D cubic lattice (right). Zinc tetrahedra are shown in blue. Black spheres represent the carbon atoms of the organic linker.

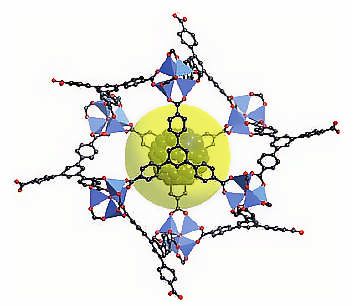
MOF-177, single cage from the zinc carboxylate.

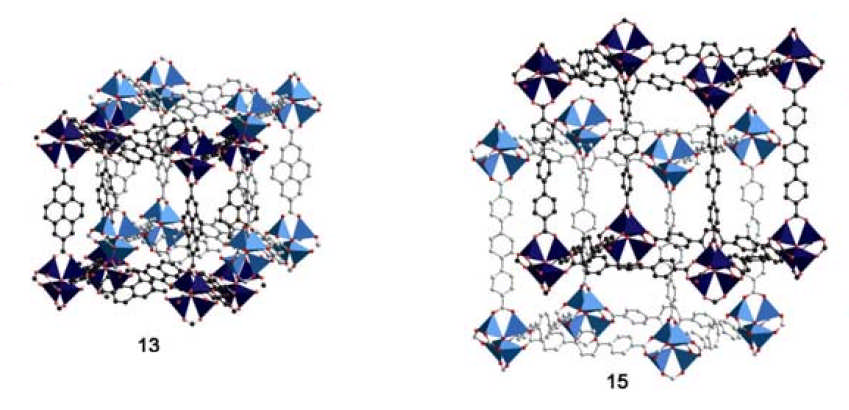
IRMOF-13 (left) and IRMOF-15 (right): Interpenetration of the low density cubic lattices.

=== HKUST-1 ===
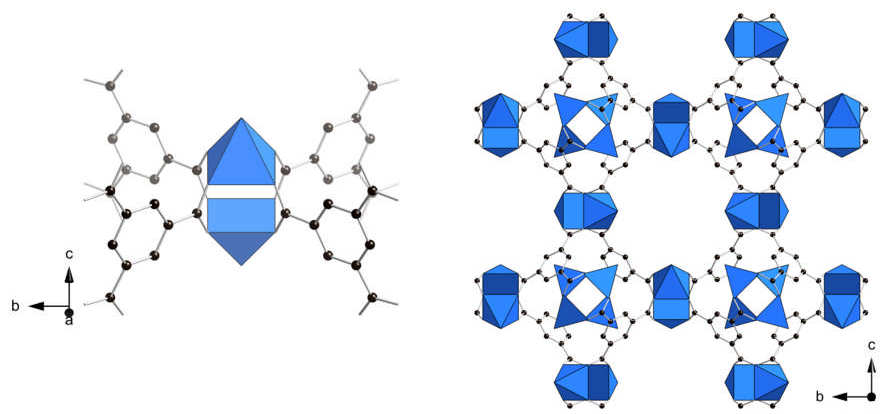
Individual Cu_{2}(CO_{2})_{4}(H_{2}O)_{2} ‘paddlewheel’ cluster coordinated by trimesic acid (left) and the porous cubic framework (right) of HKUST-1. Blue polyhedra represent the square pyramidal CuO_{5}. Black spheres represent the carbon atoms of the organic linker.

HKUST-1 is another early example of a divalent carboxylate MOF. Reported around the same time as MOF-5, HKUST-1 is a copper ‘paddlewheel’ based MOF where two copper ions form a dimeric unit with four bridging carboxylates creating a square planar geometry around two adjacent copper sites. The two copper ions in the paddlewheel coordinate to the oxygen of two water molecules to create a double square pyramidal geometry for the two metal sites in the hydrated form of the structure. Activation of the material prior to adsorption studies results in the removal of the terminal water molecules resulting in a coordinatively unsaturated metal site. The rigid, porous structure of the HKUST-1 framework combined with the accessibility of the activated metal sites upon dehydration has spurred interest in possible use in adsorption, separation and catalysis.

=== CPO-27 / MOF-74 ===
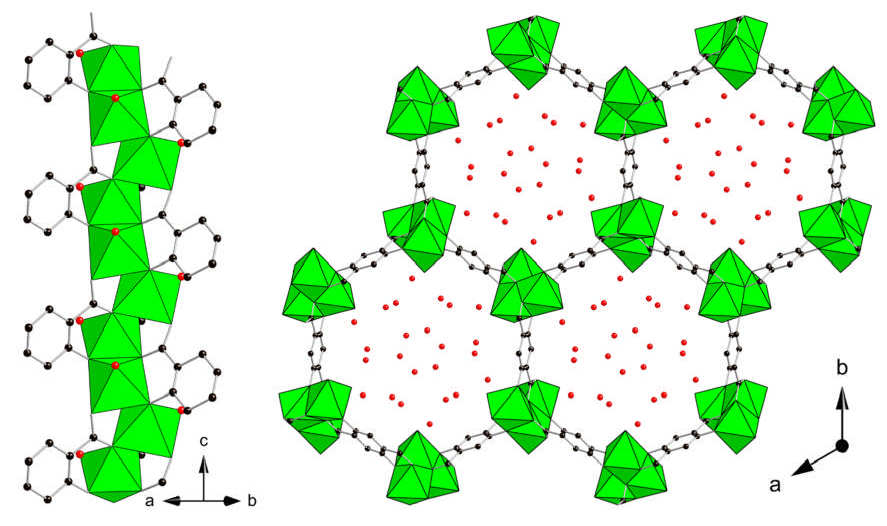
Single chain (left) and view along the hexagonal channels (right) of the nickel dihydroxyterephthalate, CPO-27(Ni). Nickel octahedra are shown in green, black spheres represent the carbon atoms of the organic linker and red spheres the oxygen of adsorbed water molecules.

While surface area and pore volume is relevant to the adsorption properties of MOF materials, another consideration is the availability of coordinatively unsaturated metals sites. The divalent metal carboxylate CPO-27(M) (where M = Co,Ni) was reported by Dietzel and co-workers, while at a similar time work by Rosi et al. produced the isostructural zinc analogue, referred to as MOF-74. The divalent metal and 2,5-dihydroxyterephthalic acid linker form a honeycomb like array of hexagonal channels. The inorganic component is a helical chain of edge sharing NiO_{6} octahedra where each metal is bound to two oxygens from hydroxyl groups on the ligand, three oxygens from carboxylate groups and one water molecule. MOF-74 was prepared using DMF as the solvent and as such, has terminal DMF molecules bound to the free metal sites on the chain. The helical chains of CPO-27(Ni) are separated by the planar dihydroxyterephthalic acid linker. This organic molecule acts as a rigid pillar between chains with each linker bound to three different metal sites from each chain. Removal of the solvent molecules from the terminal metal sites creates five-coordinate metal cations with little freedom to rotate or distort the chain to change the coordination environment. This unfavourable coordination environment means that the activated metal site has a high enthalpy of adsorption and is readily filled by adsorbed guest species. The chain is topologically identical to that of the nickel bisphosphonate STA-12(Ni) but differs upon dehydration where the additional flexibility of the bisphosphonate linker allows the chain to twist and distort reducing the accessibility of the coordinatively unsaturated metal site. The availability of this metal site in the CPO-27 framework has been explored for a number of different adsorption experiments involving gases such as CO_{2}, H_{2} and NO.

== Tricarboxylates ==
Some of the most widely studied of all metal organic frameworks are trivalent metal carboxylate materials. Extensive work in this area has provided an understanding of the crystal chemistry of a wide variety of the trivalent first row transition metals

=== MIL-47 & MIL-53 ===
The vanadium terephthalate MIL-47, first reported by Barthelet and co-workers, is an example of a metal organic framework consisting of infinite corner sharing metal chains of VO_{6} octahedra bridged by the linear terephthalate organic linker. This connectivity results in the formation of large diamond shaped channels. The channels in as-prepared vanadium MIL-47 contain some residual guest terephthalic acid and is reported as having the formula V^{III}(OH)(CO_{2}-C_{6}H_{4}-CO_{2}) and a hydroxide μ_{2}-OH ion forming the infinite chains. Activation of the solid by heating in a tube furnace at 573 K for 24 hours results in deprotonation of the hydroxide on the chains to form a μ_{2}-oxo and oxidation of the vanadium, to give V^{IV}O(CO_{2}-C_{6}H_{4}-CO_{2}) as the formula for the activated material. The activated MIL-47(V) is anhydrous at room temperature under ambient pressure, as the channels are hydrophobic, being lined with phenyl rings and with no accessible metal sites or favourable hydrogen bonding positions the channels are hydrophobic. MIL-53 was first reported with chromium (Cr^{3+}) and shortly after with aluminium (Al^{3+}) with terephthalic acid as the linker. MIL-53 is isostructural with MIL-47, the main difference is that MIL-53 only contains the trivalent metal and a μ_{2}-hydroxide bridge whereas the activated MIL-47 is the tetravalent V^{4+} with μ_{2}-oxobridging. As the activated form of the MIL-53 contains the metal hydroxide chains, the channels are hydrophilic with the hydroxide protons available for hydrogen bonding. When activated MIL-53(Cr or Al) is exposed to moisture, X-ray diffraction shows the material adopts a ‘closed’ structure, due to the strong hydrogen bonding interaction between the hydroxyl groups of the inorganic chains and the adsorbed water molecules. As a result of this hydration behavior, the unit cell volume reduces by ~30%, fully reversible upon subsequent dehydration. Such large structural changes, in response to adsorption of gas or solvent molecules, is commonly referred to as ‘breathing’. Since the initial reports of the chromium and aluminium MIL-53, extensive work has been undertaken in this area, and the range of MIL-53 materials now extends to: Cr^{3+}, Al^{3+}, Fe^{3+}, Ga^{3+}, In^{3+}, Sc^{3+}.

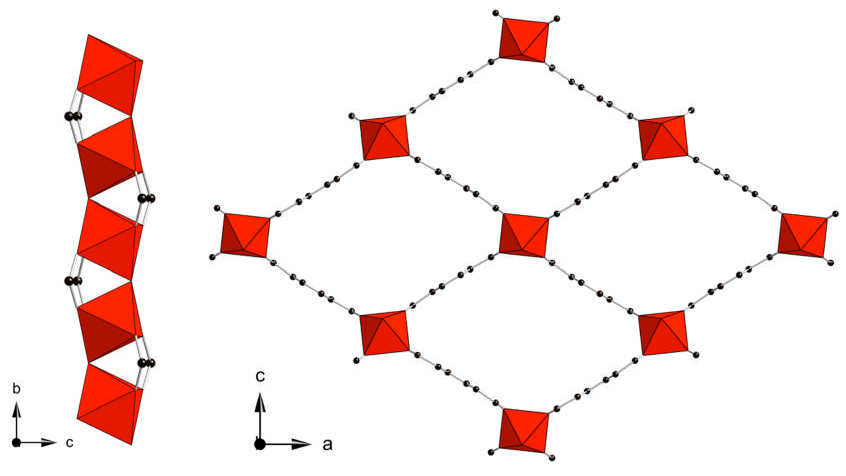
Corner sharing vanadium chains (left) and view along the rhombic channels (right) of the vanadium terephthalate, MIL-47(V).62 Vanadium octahedra are shown in red, black spheres represent the carbon atoms of the organic linker.

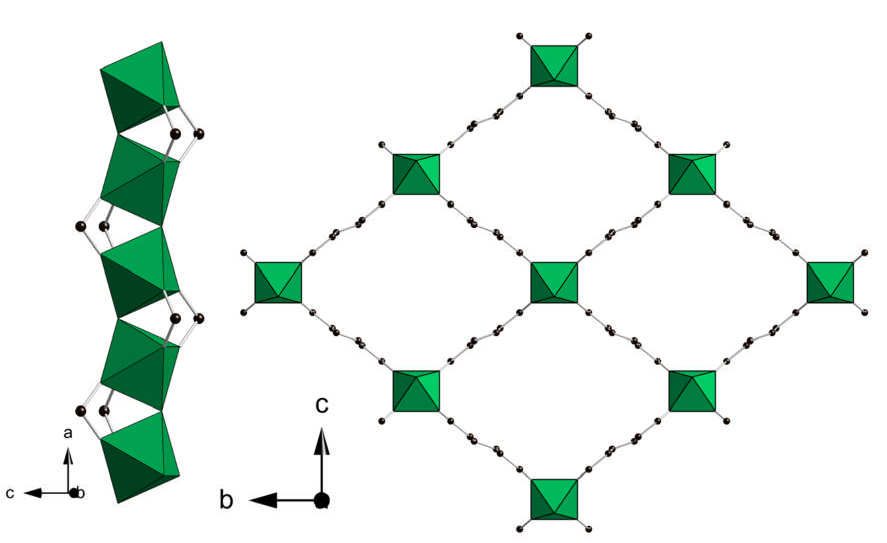
Corner sharing chromium hydroxide chains (left) and large pore (dehydrated) framework of MIL-53(Cr) (right). Chromium octahedra are shown in green, black spheres represent the carbon atoms of the organic linker.

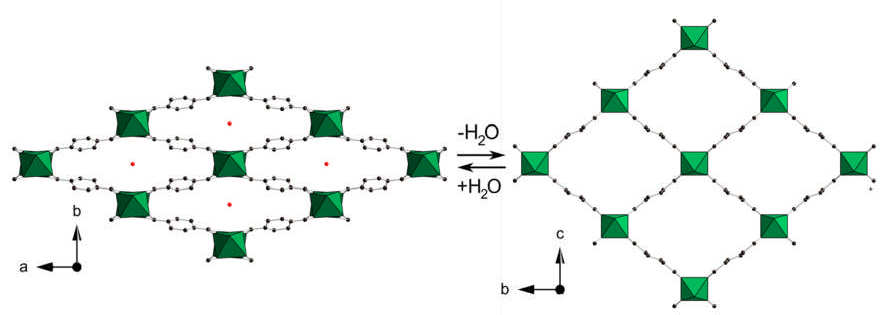
MIL-53(Cr) in the hydrated (narrow pore) state (left) and in the dehydrated (large pore) state (right). Chromium octahedra are shown in green, black spheres represent the carbon atoms of the organic linker.

=== MIL-68 ===
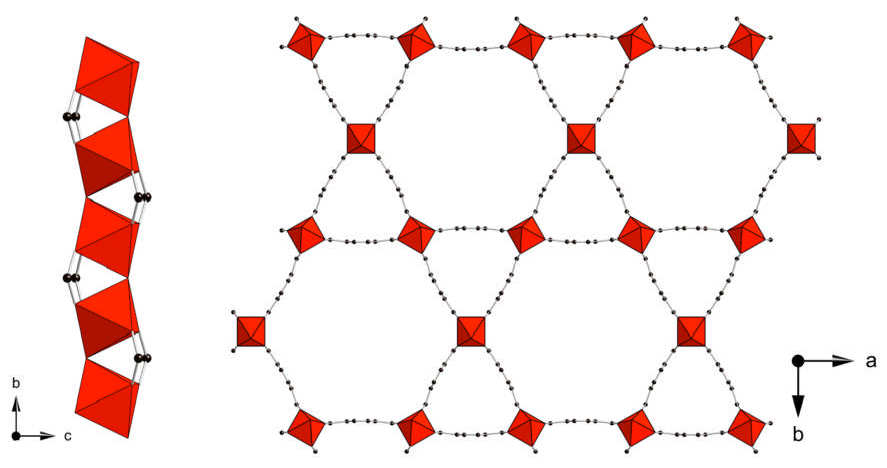
Corner sharing vanadium chains (left) and large pore framework of MIL-68(V) (right). 64 Vanadium octahedra are shown in red, black spheres represent the carbon atoms of the organic linker.

Work by Barthelet and co-workers also identified MIL-68, another trivalent metal terephthalate. The framework is a polymorph of the MIL-47/MIL-53 structure with the chemical formula, M^{III}OH(CO_{2}-C_{6}H_{4}-CO_{2}) initially reported for V^{3+} and later with In^{3+} and Ga^{3+}. In this case the metal hydroxide chains connect to form two types of unidirectional channels, triangular and hexagonal in shape, creating a kagome lattice-like network of pore channels. The cross-sectional diameters of the triangular and hexagonal channels are 6 Å and 17 Å respectively. N,N'-Dimethylformamide (DMF) solvent molecules were observed in the smaller triangular channels of as-prepared MIL-68(In) reported by Volkringer et al., disordered over two positions, with hydrogen bonding between the oxygen of the DMF and the hydroxyl group of the inorganic chain. The solvent was removed by calcination at 200 °C (392 °F) overnight in a furnace. The activated samples were stored under inert atmosphere to prevent rehydration which would lead to hydrolysis and ultimately decomposition of the structure. Adsorption studies on the indium and gallium forms of MIL-68 give a value for the BET surface area of 1117 m^{2}/g, 746 m^{2}/g and 603 m^{2}/g for the gallium, indium and vanadium forms respectively. A number of activation procedures were attempted and NMR analysis used to verify complete removal of guest molecules to obtain the surface area results. The BET values suggest that the indium and vanadium analogues were not fully activated prior to adsorption. A computational study of the theoretical surface area, gave a value of 3333 m^{2}/g for MIL-68(V) suggesting that there may still be activation issues with all the MIL-68 derivatives, rendering some of the porosity in accessible.

=== MIL-88 ===
Further study on the metal carboxylate systems of trivalent iron and chromium yielded a series of materials referred to as MIL-88(A-D). First reported as an iron fumarate, and based on the trimeric building unit obtained on the crystallization of iron (and chromium) acetate, MIL-88 is a family of isoreticular materials prepared withdicarboxylate linkers.

Reactions using the metal acetate trimeric building unit are thought to proceed via a ligand exchange mechanism where the acetate of the starting material is replaced with a longer linear dicarboxylate to create the three dimensional framework. MIL-88 is an isoreticular series with increasing length of dicarboxylate forming the same network topology prepared using the fumaric acid (MIL-88A), terephthalic acid (-88B), naphthalene-2,6-dicarboxylic acid (-88C) and biphenyl-4,4'-dicarboxylic acid (-88D). The framework consists of both one dimensional channels, and trigonal bipyramidal cages. Solvent exchange experiments on the terephthalate form, MIL-88B, show that large organic molecules such as lutidine and butanol are able to enter the framework and induce an increase in cell volume over the dried material. The three metals in the trimeric cluster share a μ_{3}-O and are bridged to the adjacent metals with four carboxylate groups, leaving a coordinatively unsaturated metal site pointing into the cages within the framework. To maintain charge balance in the material, there must be one negatively charged species on the cluster, either a hydroxide or fluoride (depending on the synthesis conditions) occupying one of the unsaturated metal sites and the other two could be water or exchanged solvent species.

MIL-88(Cr and Fe) also exhibits a breathing behaviour in response to solvent exchange and gas adsorption. The mechanism for the breathing is similar to that observed in the MIL-53 where there is a hinge like motion around the axis of the two oxygen atoms of the carboxylate. The observed expansion and contraction of the unit cell volume is, however, much greater than that observed in MIL-53. As the trimeric units are connected in three dimensions, rather than the columnar rows of terephthalates connecting the chains in MIL-53, the change occurs over all three axes resulting in a cell volume expansion for the terephthalate form (MIL-88B) of 125% from the fully dried form (1500 Å^{3}) to the most open form observed upon methanol solvation (3375 Å^{3}).

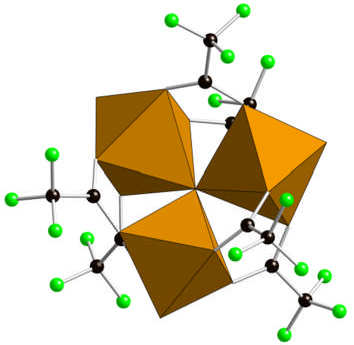
Iron trimer unit with bridging trifluoroacetate anions. Iron octahedra are shown in brown, black and green spheres represent the carbon and fluorine atoms of the organic linker respectively.

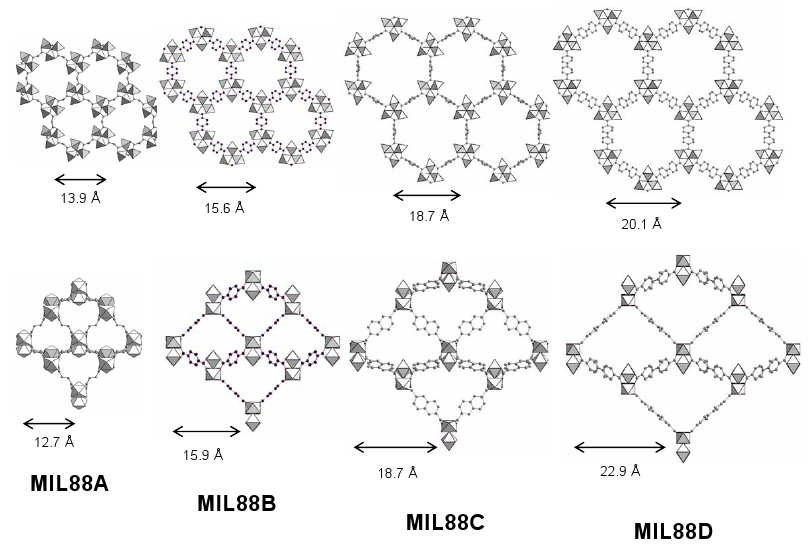
MIL-88(Fe or Cr) series with the fumarate, terephthalate, naphthalate and biphenyldicarboxylate linkers respectively.

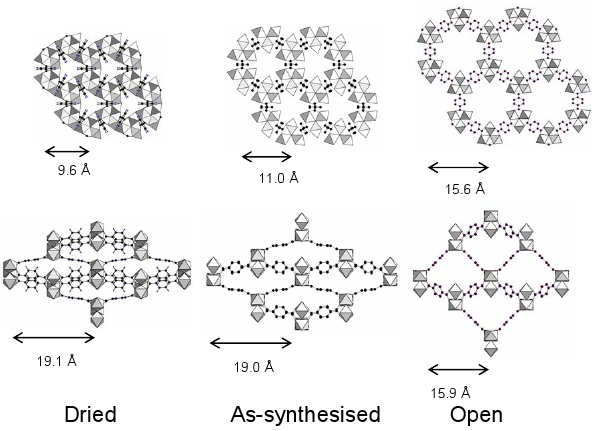
Open and closed MIL-88(Fe or Cr).
