= Urturn =

- Website type: Social network
- Available in: English
- Website: www.urturn.com
- Commercial: Yes
- Registration: Required
- Users: Undisclosed
- Launched: Early 2011
- Current status: Shut down
- Written in: Ruby on Rails

Urturn was a social network initially launched in early 2011 as Webdoc by co-founders Stelio and Alexander Tzonis. The company raised $500,000 from family and friends before its series A funding round. Webdoc was relaunched as Urturn in January 2013 followed by an accompanying iPhone app in May. With the news of the app, Urturn also announced it had completed $13.4 million Series A fundraising round with $10.7 million contributed by Balderton Capital and $2.7 million invested by the private equity arm of Debiopharm Group.

Chief executive Stelio Tzonis said that use of the funding will be prioritized for building the API and advancing development of Urturn across multiple platforms, including Android.

Marketed as a "social platform for self-expression", the site provided templates for users to customize media such as photos. The resulting content could then be shared over Urturn, as well as to Facebook and Twitter. Urturn goal at that time was to let developers create their own templates with the release of an API.

Urturn headquarters were in London and had an office in Silicon Valley. It employed up to 25 staff.

Urturn was more popular among teens and young adults and among females. The U.S., followed by the UK, and then South America accounted for most of the site's traffic. The service was also used by music brands such as One Direction. Urturn hoped these brands would be a source of revenue in addition to affiliate deals for music and other products.

The social network development stopped in December 2014, followed by a complete shutdown of the platform early 2015.
