= C14H16N2O6S3 =

The molecular formula C_{14}H_{16}N_{2}O_{6}S_{3} (molar mass: 404.48 g/mol) may refer to:

- Aldesulfone sodium
- Sulfoxone
