= DUT-5 =

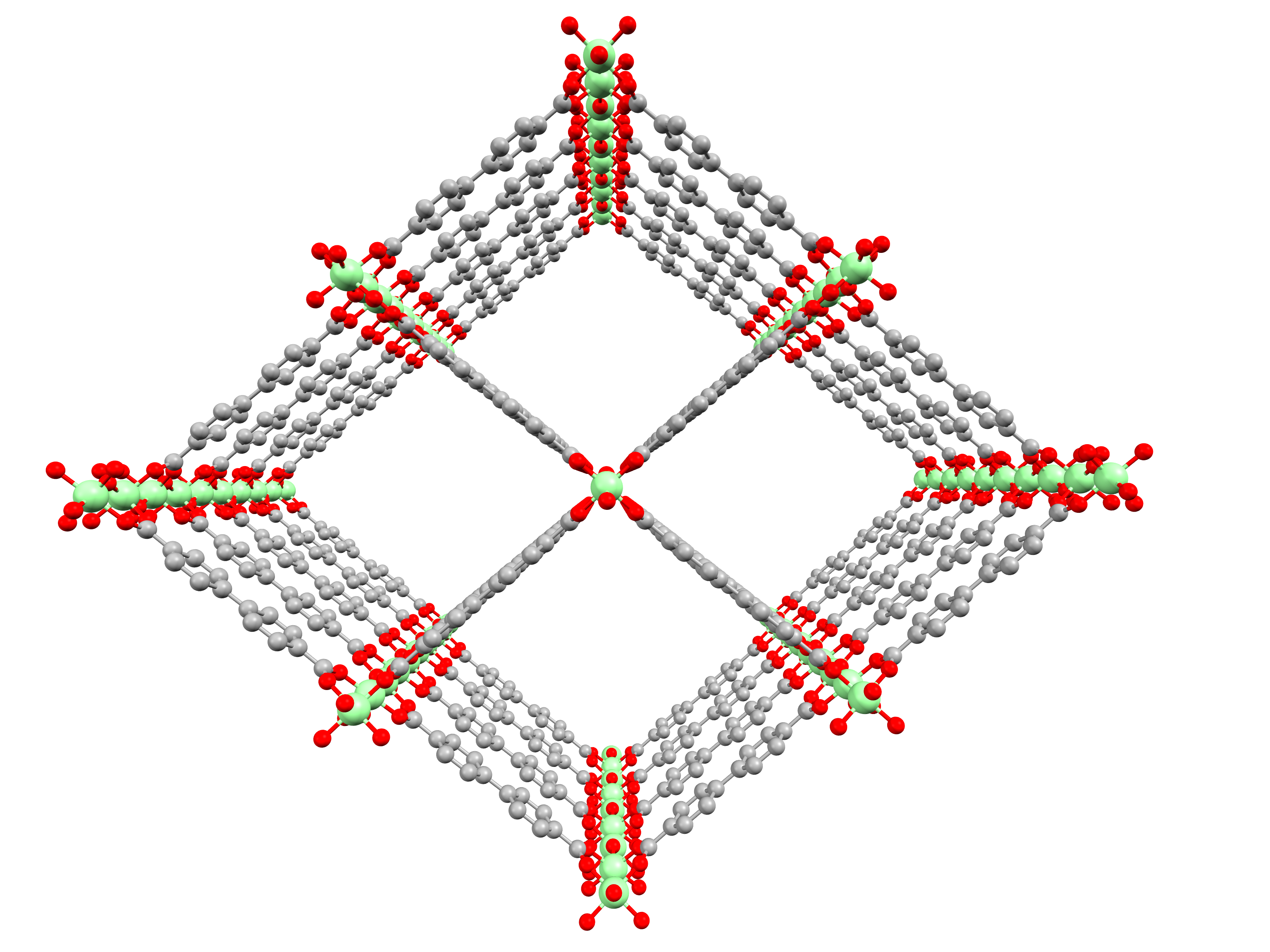
Crystal structure of DUT-5. Perspective view of the pore cross-section. Metal: green, oxygen: red, carbon: grey, hydrogen: not shown.

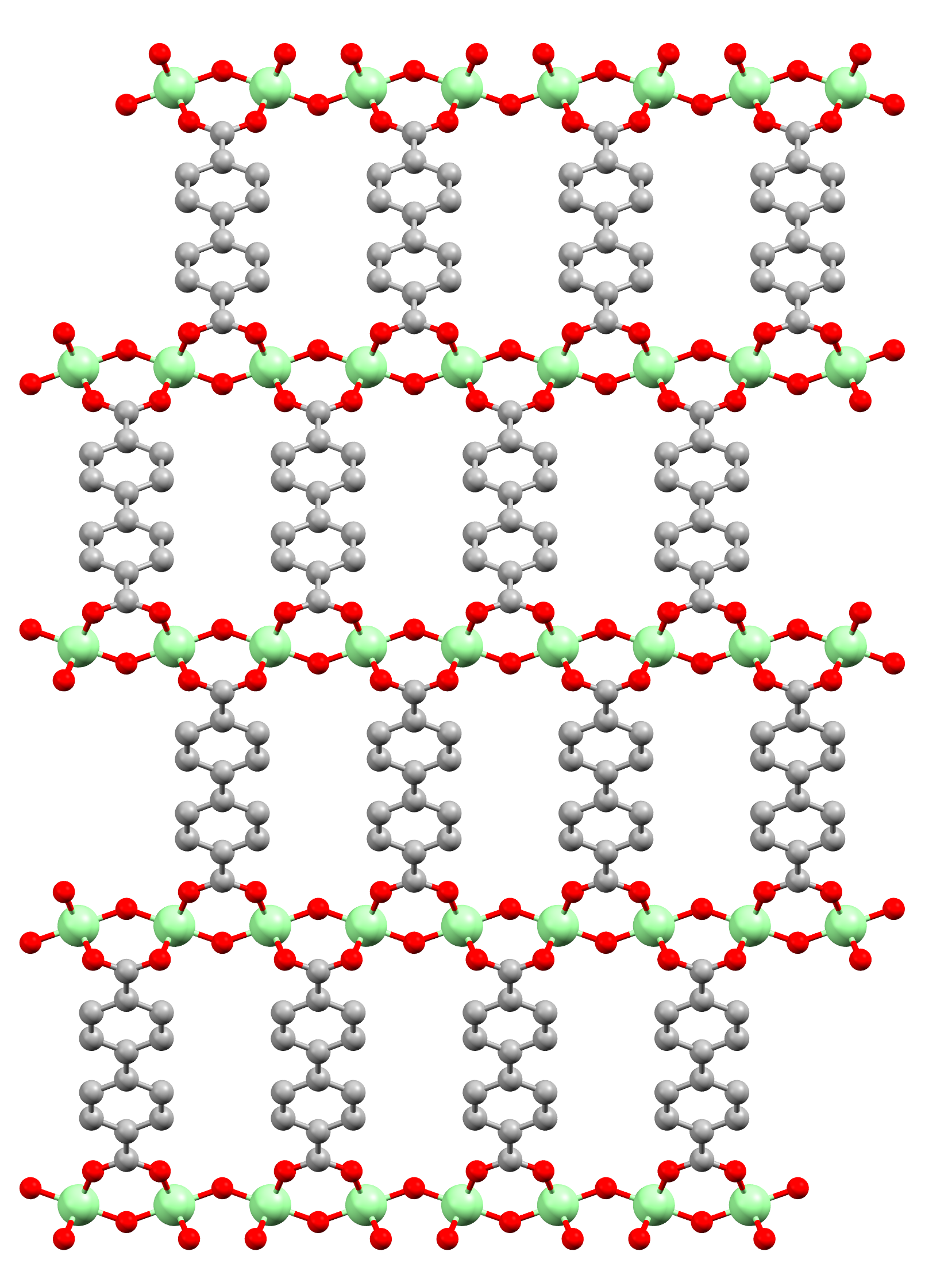
Crystal structure of DUT-5. Orthographic view of the M-OH chains, which are connected by biphenyl-4,4'-dicarboxylate linker molecules. Metal: green, oxygen: red, carbon: grey, hydrogen: not shown.

DUT-5 (DUT ⇒ Dresden University of Technology) is a material in the class of metal-organic frameworks (MOFs). Metal-organic frameworks are crystalline materials, in which metals are linked by ligands (linker molecules) to form repeating three-dimensional structures known as coordination entities. The DUT-5 framework is an expanded version of the MIL-53 structure and consists of Al^{3+} metal centers and biphenyl-4,4'-dicarboxylate (BPDC) linker molecules. It consists of inorganic [M-OH] chains, which are connected by the biphenyl-4,4'-dicarboxylate linkers to four neighboring inorganic chains. The resulting structure contains diamond-shaped micropores extending in one dimension.

== Structural analogs ==
The DUT-5 structure was initially synthesized with Al^{3+} as metal center, but other isostructural materials, whose structures are comparable to DUT-5, have also been prepared with metals having oxidation states of +II or +IV .

Overview of non-functionalized DUT-5 analogs
Name	Metal center and oxidation state	Year of first report	Citation
DUT-5(Al)	Al^{3+}	2009	
COMOC-2	V^{3+}/V^{4+}, V^{4+}	2013	
Mg(4S-PNO)(BPDC)	Mg^{2+}	2018	
Co(4S-PNO)(BPDC)	Co^{2+}	2018	

Due to the tool-box like design of metal-organic framework materials, other organic molecules, which are structurally similar to biphenyl-4,4'-dicarboxylate, have also been used as linker molecules for the synthesis of functionalized DUT-5 materials, which contain uncoordinated functional groups in their framework structure. For the functionalized DUT-5 materials, the additional functional groups at the functional biphenyl-4,4'dicarboxylate linkers in the DUT-5 framework have been used for post-synthetic modification reactions to further modify the framework structure after the initial synthesis or to alter the adsorption properties.

Overview of functionalized DUT-5 analogs
Functional linker	Metal center		
Functional linker	Al	V	Ga
2,2'-Bipyridine-5,5'-dicarboxylate	MOF-253	-	COMOC-4
4,4'-Bibenzoic acid-2,2'-sulfone			-
2-amino[1,1'-biphenyl]-4,4'-dicarboxylate		-	-
2-ethynyl[1,1'-biphenyl]-4,4'-dicarboxylate		-	-
2-azido[1,1'-biphenyl]-4,4'-dicarboxylate		-	-
2-nitro[1,1'-biphenyl]-4,4'-dicarboxylate		-	-
2-iodo[1,1'-biphenyl]-4,4'-dicarboxylate		-	-
