= Naphtholactam =

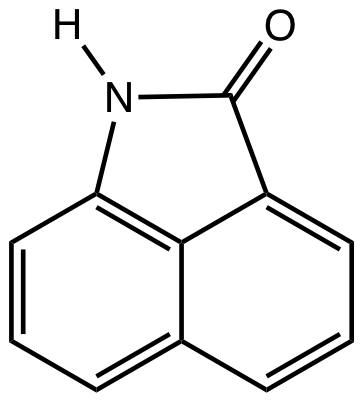

Names
- Preferred IUPAC name Benzo[cd]indol-2(1H)-one
- Other names 1,8-naphtholactam

Identifiers
CAS Number	130-00-7
3D model (JSmol)	Interactive image
ChEMBL	ChEMBL217045
ChemSpider	60558
ECHA InfoCard	100.004.523
EC Number	204-973-4
PubChem CID	67222
CompTox Dashboard (EPA)	DTXSID5059610
- InChI: InChI=1S/C11H7NO/c13-11-8-5-1-3-7-4-2-6-9(12-11)10(7)8/h1-6H,(H,12,13) Key: GPYLCFQEKPUWLD-UHFFFAOYSA-N
- SMILES: C1=CC2=C3C(=C1)C(=O)NC3=CC=C2

Properties
Chemical formula	C_{11}H_{7}NO
Molar mass	169.183 g·mol^{−1}
Appearance	white solid
Melting point	181 °C (358 °F; 454 K)

Hazards
- GHS labelling
Pictograms	(GHS07: Exclamation mark)
Signal word	Warning
Hazard statements	H302
Precautionary statements	P264, P270, P301+P312, P330, P501
- Except where otherwise noted, data are given for materials in their standard state (at 25 °C [77 °F], 100 kPa). Infobox references

Naphtholactam is an organic compound derived from naphthalene. It is a tricyclic species consisting of a naphthalene core fused with a lactam (NH-CO-) at the 1,8-positions. The N-alkyl derivatives are commercially important.

== Preparation ==
Naphtholactams can be prepared by Lossen rearrangement of N-(aryloxy)naphthalimides, which is available from 1,8-naphthalic anhydride. Alternatively, it forms efficiently by aluminium trichloride-catalyzed cyclization of naphthalene-1-isocyanate. A variety of other methods are available, e.g., cobalt-catalyzed carbonylation of 1-amidonaphthalenes.

== Dye precursor ==
It is a precursor to the dye anthanthrone via ring-opening to the amino carboxylic acid, which can be converted to the diazonium salt. Naphthostyril derivatives are also of interest in medicinal chemistry. Naphthostyrils can be produced by metal-catalyzed cyclization of 1-naphthylamides.

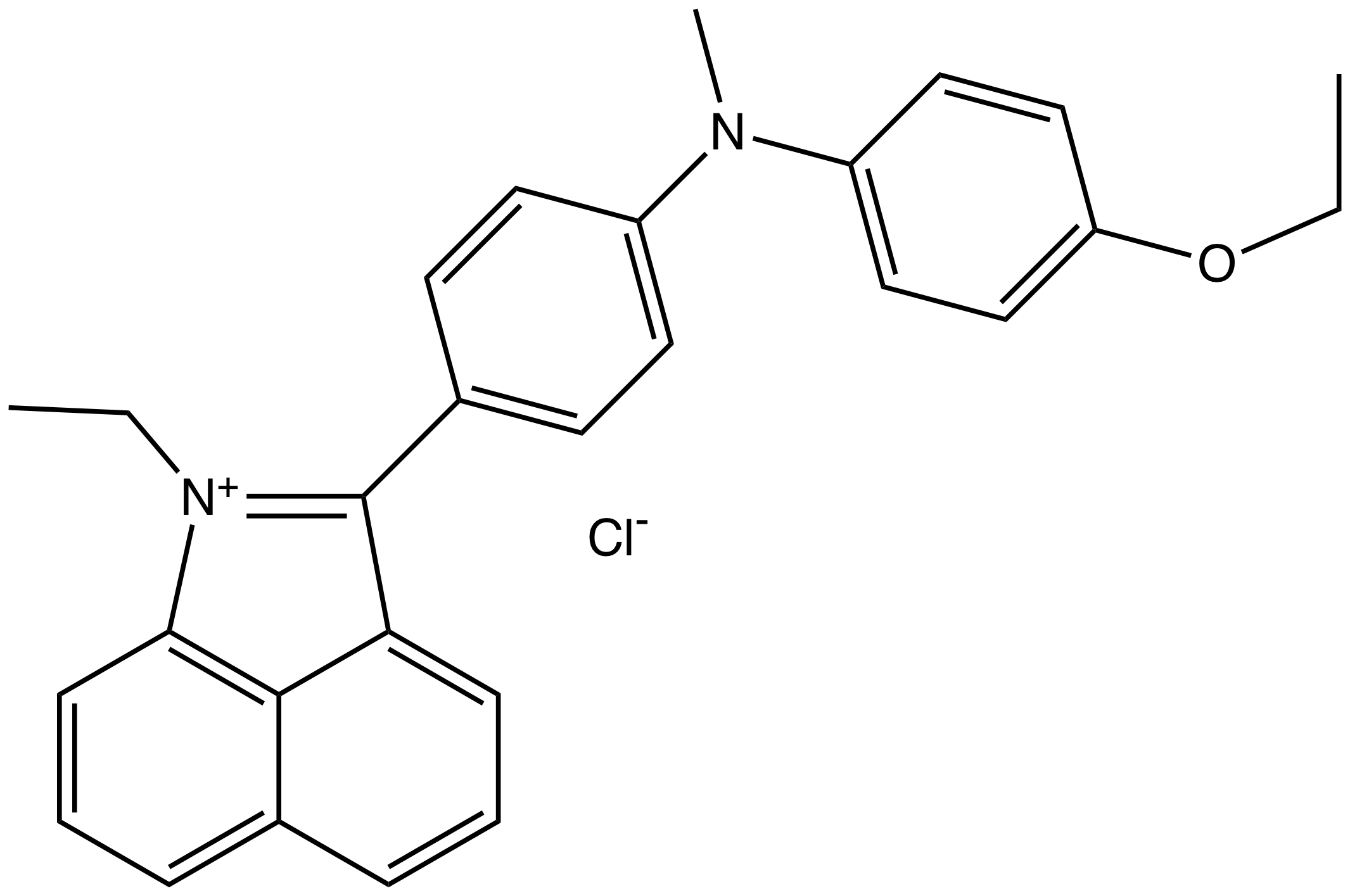
Chemical structure of typical naphtholactam dye.

N-Ethylnaphtholactam and related derivatives are precursors to many dyes. The lactam condenses with anilines in the presence of phosphorus oxychloride. Condensation with malononitrile gives a so-called zeromethine dye, which is used in printing.

== Related ==
Naphthalimides, with the formula C_{10}H_{6}-1,8-(CO)_{2}NR, are derived by reaction of 1,8-naphthalic anhydride with amines.
