= C12H8O4 =

The molecular formula C_{12}H_{8}O_{4} (molar mass : 216.19 g/mol) may refer to:

- Bergapten, a psoralen found in bergamot essential oil
- Methoxsalen, a drug used to treat psoriasis, eczema or vitiligo
- 2,6-Naphthalenedicarboxylic acid
