= C13H20N4O3 =

The molecular formula C_{13}H_{20}N_{4}O_{3} may refer to:

- Albifylline, a bio-active xanthine derivative
- Lisofylline, a synthetic small molecule with novel anti-inflammatory properties
