= Polyethylene naphthalate =

Names
- Other names Poly(ethylene 2,6-naphthalate); PEN

Identifiers
| CAS Number | 24968-11-4 |
| ChemSpider | none |

Properties
| Chemical formula | (C_{14}H_{10}O_{4})_{n} |
- Except where otherwise noted, data are given for materials in their standard state (at 25 °C [77 °F], 100 kPa). Infobox references

Polyethylene naphthalate (poly(ethylene 2,6-naphthalate) or PEN) is a polyester derived from naphthalene-2,6-dicarboxylic acid and ethylene glycol. As such it is related to poly(ethylene terephthalate), but with superior barrier properties.

== Production ==
Two major manufacturing routes exist for polyethylene naphthalate (PEN), i.e. an ester or an acid process, named according to whether the starting monomer is a diester or a diacid derivative, respectively. In both cases for PEN, the glycol monomer is ethylene glycol. Solid-state polymerization (SSP) of the melt-produced resin pellets is the preferred process to increase the average molecular weight of PEN.

== Applications ==
Because it provides a very good oxygen barrier, it is well-suited for bottling beverages that are susceptible to oxidation, such as beer. It is also used in making high performance sailcloth.

Significant commercial markets have been developed for its application in textile and industrial fibers, films, and foamed articles, containers for carbonated beverages, water and other liquids, and thermoformed applications. It is also an emerging material for modern electronic devices.

- PEN was the medium for Advanced Photo System film (discontinued in 2011).
- PEN is used for manufacturing high performance fibers that have very high modulus and better dimensional stability than PET or Nylon fibers.
- PEN is used as the substrate for most Linear Tape-Open (LTO) cartridges.

It also has been found to show excellent scintillation properties and is expected to replace classic plastic scintillators.

== Benefits when compared to polyethylene terephthalate ==
The two condensed aromatic rings of PEN confer on it improvements in strength and modulus, chemical and hydrolytic resistance, gaseous barrier, thermal and thermo-oxidative resistance and ultraviolet (UV) light barrier resistance compared to polyethylene terephthalate (PET). PEN is intended as a PET replacement, especially when used as a substrate for flexible integrated circuits.
