= 2,6-Diisopropylnaphthalene =

Names
- Preferred IUPAC name 2,6-Di(propan-2-yl)naphthalene
- Other names 2,6-DIPN

Identifiers
CAS Number	24157-81-1
3D model (JSmol)	Interactive image
ChEBI	CHEBI:145669
ChemSpider	29899
ECHA InfoCard	100.041.845
PubChem CID	32241
UNII	1X71YEU9QB
CompTox Dashboard (EPA)	DTXSID7035272
- InChI: InChI=1S/C16H20/c1-11(2)13-5-7-16-10-14(12(3)4)6-8-15(16)9-13/h5-12H,1-4H3 Key: GWLLTEXUIOFAFE-UHFFFAOYSA-N; InChI=1/C16H20/c1-11(2)13-5-7-16-10-14(12(3)4)6-8-15(16)9-13/h5-12H,1-4H3 Key: GWLLTEXUIOFAFE-UHFFFAOYAH
- SMILES: CC(C)C1=CC2=C(C=C1)C=C(C=C2)C(C)C

Properties
Chemical formula	C_{16}H_{20}
Molar mass	212.336 g·mol^{−1}
Appearance	colorless solid
Melting point	70 °C (158 °F; 343 K)
- Except where otherwise noted, data are given for materials in their standard state (at 25 °C [77 °F], 100 kPa). Infobox references

2,6-Diisopropylnaphthalene (2,6-DIPN) is an organic compound with the formula C_{10}H_{6}(i-Pr)_{2} (where i-Pr = isopropyl). 2,6-DIPN is one of several isomers of diisopropylnaphthalene. It is a white or colorless solid.

2,6-DIPN is plant growth regulator. It helps inhibit the sprouting of potatoes during storage, especially in combination with chlorpropham. 2,6-DIPN is intended for use in the manufacturing of products intended to prevent sprouting of stored potatoes.

2,6-DIPN can be oxidized to 2,6-naphthalenedicarboxylic acid.

== Toxicity ==
No risks to human health are expected from exposure.
