= Alrestatin =

Names
- Preferred IUPAC name (1,3-Dioxo-1H-benzo[de]isoquinolin-2(3H)-yl)acetic acid

Identifiers
CAS Number	51411-04-2
3D model (JSmol)	Interactive image
ChEMBL	ChEMBL63055
ChemSpider	2036
KEGG	D02835
PubChem CID	2120
UNII	515DHK15LG
CompTox Dashboard (EPA)	DTXSID7045655
- InChI: InChI=1S/C14H9NO4/c16-11(17)7-15-13(18)9-5-1-3-8-4-2-6-10(12(8)9)14(15)19/h1-6H,7H2,(H,16,17) Key: GCUCIFQCGJIRNT-UHFFFAOYSA-N; InChI=1/C14H9NO4/c16-11(17)7-15-13(18)9-5-1-3-8-4-2-6-10(12(8)9)14(15)19/h1-6H,7H2,(H,16,17) Key: GCUCIFQCGJIRNT-UHFFFAOYAQ
- SMILES: C1=CC2=C3C(=C1)C(=O)N(C(=O)C3=CC=C2)CC(=O)O

Properties
Chemical formula	C_{14}H_{9}NO_{4}
Molar mass	255.229 g·mol^{−1}
- Except where otherwise noted, data are given for materials in their standard state (at 25 °C [77 °F], 100 kPa). Infobox references

Alrestatin is an inhibitor of aldose reductase, an enzyme involved in the pathogenesis of complications of diabetes mellitus, including diabetic neuropathy.

Alrestat was first synthesized in 1969 and was the first aldose reductase inhibitor (ARI) with oral bioavailability to undergo clinical trials, in the late 1970s and early 1980s. Low-quality trials and a high incidence of adverse effects (particularly hepatotoxicity) led to termination of its development, and it was never in clinical use. It is structurally related to tolrestat, another ARI that was briefly marketed before being withdrawn in 1997.

== Synthesis ==
Alrestatin can be synthesized by the reaction of naphthalic anhydride with glycine.

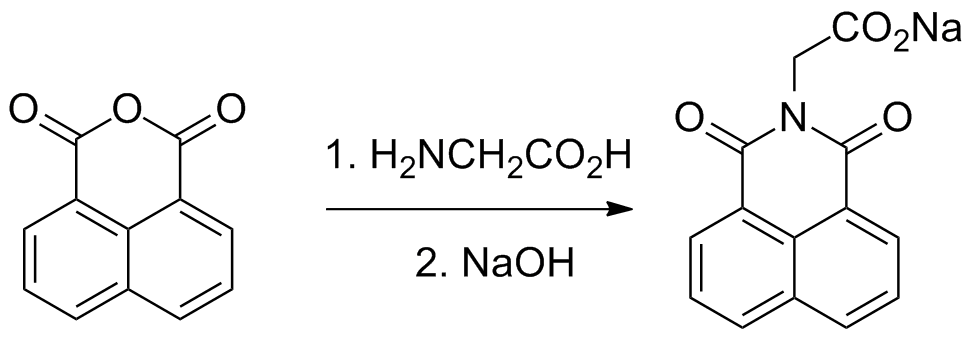
Alrestatin synthesis

== See also ==
- Amonafide
- Scriptaid
