= 2,6-Dimethylnaphthalene =

Names
- Preferred IUPAC name 2,6-Dimethylnaphthalene

Identifiers
CAS Number	581-42-0
3D model (JSmol)	Interactive image
ChEBI	CHEBI:34251
ChemSpider	10909
ECHA InfoCard	100.008.605
PubChem CID	11387
UNII	76U29QW3FM
CompTox Dashboard (EPA)	DTXSID0029187
- InChI: InChI=1S/C12H12/c1-9-3-5-12-8-10(2)4-6-11(12)7-9/h3-8H,1-2H3 Key: YGYNBBAUIYTWBF-UHFFFAOYSA-N; InChI=1/C12H12/c1-9-3-5-12-8-10(2)4-6-11(12)7-9/h3-8H,1-2H3 Key: YGYNBBAUIYTWBF-UHFFFAOYAZ
- SMILES: Cc1ccc2cc(ccc2c1)C

Properties
Chemical formula	C_{12}H_{12}
Molar mass	156.228 g·mol^{−1}
Appearance	white solid
Melting point	110 °C (230 °F; 383 K)
Boiling point	261 °C (502 °F; 534 K) 101.3 kPa
- Except where otherwise noted, data are given for materials in their standard state (at 25 °C [77 °F], 100 kPa). Infobox references

2,6-Dimethylnaphthalene (2,6-DMN) is a polycyclic aromatic hydrocarbon with the formula C_{10}H_{6}(CH_{3})_{2}. It is one of the ten isomers of dimethylnaphthalenes.

== Synthesis ==
Alkylated naphthalenes (methyl-, dimethyl-, and poly-methyl naphthalenes, thus including 2,6-DMN) are found in crude oil and coal tar. Separation is difficult, expensive, and requires a number of operations such as selective crystallization and adsorption, in addition to any isomerization reactions. Alternative routes to 2,6-DMN remains of interest.

In the "alkenylation process" butadiene (1), o-xylene (2), and sodium–potassium alloy (3) are used, which react to form 5-(ortho-tolyl)pent-2-ene (OTP, 3). OTP is subsequently cyclized to 1,5-dimethyltetraline (4). Dehydrogenation then provides 1,5-dimethylnaphthalene (1,5-DMN, 5). Finally, 1,5-DMN is isomerized to 2,6-DMN (6). In the final step, other mono-, di-, and tri-methylnaphthalenes are formed. More work is therefore required in separation of the mixture, which is done by selective crystallization.

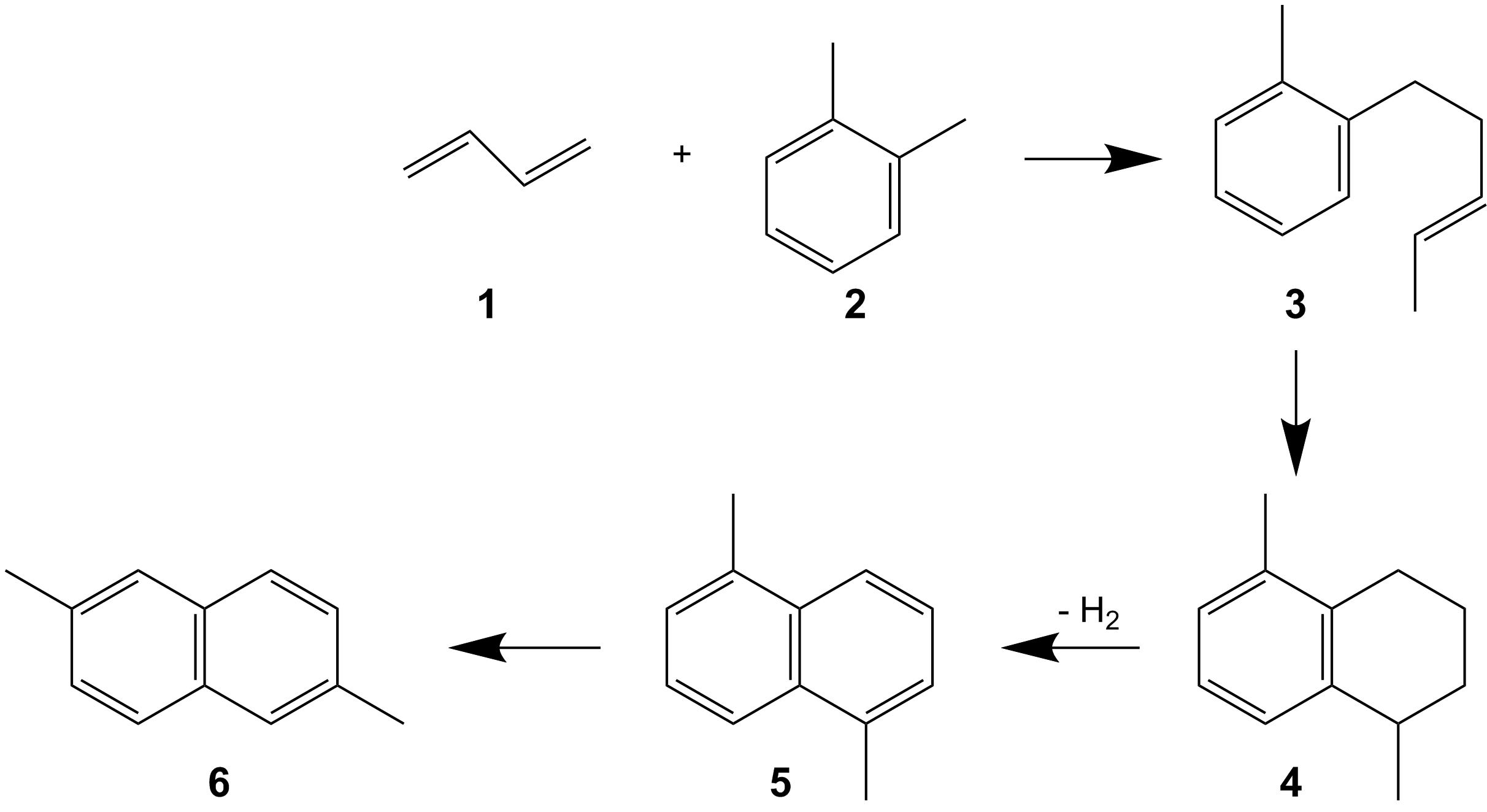
Synthesis of 2,6-dimethylnaphthalene by the alkenylation process

== Applications ==
2,6-Dimethylnaphthalene is mainly used for the preparation of 2,6-naphthalenedicarboxylic acid by oxidation of 2,6-dimethylnaphthalene in the liquid phase. 2,6-Naphthalenedicarboxylic acid is a monomer for the production of high-performance polymers, in particular poly (ethylene-2,6-naphthalene dicarboxylate) or shorter polyethylene naphthalate (PEN). That polyester is stronger and has a higher thermal resistance than the more frequently used polyethylene terephthalate (PET).

2,6-Dimethylnaphthalene undergoes ammoxidation to give the 2,6-dicyanonaphthalene, which can be hydrogenated to bis(aminomethyl)naphthalene, a precursor to dyes.
