= Anthanthrone =

Names
- Preferred IUPAC name Dibenzo[def,mno]chrysene-6,12-dione
- Other names Anthanthrone orange

Identifiers
CAS Number	641-13-4
3D model (JSmol)	Interactive image
ChemSpider	84997
ECHA InfoCard	100.010.339
EC Number	211-372-0
PubChem CID	94183
UNII	T93Y5J867C
CompTox Dashboard (EPA)	DTXSID00214302
- InChI: InChI=1S/C22H10O2/c23-21-13-5-1-3-11-7-9-16-19(17(11)13)20-15(21)10-8-12-4-2-6-14(18(12)20)22(16)24/h1-10H Key: PGEHNUUBUQTUJB-UHFFFAOYSA-N
- SMILES: C1=CC2=C3C(=C1)C(=O)C4=C5C3=C(C=C2)C(=O)C6=CC=CC(=C65)C=C4

Properties
Chemical formula	C_{22}H_{10}O_{2}
Molar mass	306.320 g·mol^{−1}
- Except where otherwise noted, data are given for materials in their standard state (at 25 °C [77 °F], 100 kPa). Infobox references

Anthanthrone is a synthetic anthraquinone. Its derivative 4,10-dibromoanthanthrone (Pigment Red 168) is a component of some industrial paints. It is prepared from naphthostyril.
