= Nilofabicin =

Clinical data
- Other names: CG-400549

Identifiers
- IUPAC name: 1-[(3-amino-2-methylphenyl)methyl]-4-(2-thiophen-2-ylethoxy)pyridin-2-one
- CAS Number: 934628-27-0
- PubChem CID: 11844916
- IUPHAR/BPS: 10984
- DrugBank: DB12347
- ChemSpider: 10019391
- UNII: 4X6T64D64X
- ChEMBL: ChEMBL488937
- CompTox Dashboard (EPA): DTXSID00239434

Chemical and physical data
- Formula: C_{19}H_{20}N_{2}O_{2}S
- Molar mass: 340.44 g·mol^{−1}
- 3D model (JSmol): Interactive image
- SMILES: CC1=C(C=CC=C1N)CN2C=CC(=CC2=O)OCCC3=CC=CS3
- InChI: InChI=1S/C19H20N2O2S/c1-14-15(4-2-6-18(14)20)13-21-9-7-16(12-19(21)22)23-10-8-17-5-3-11-24-17/h2-7,9,11-12H,8,10,13,20H2,1H3; Key:YCLREGRRHGLOAK-UHFFFAOYSA-N

Nilofabicin (CG-400549) is an experimental antibiotic medication related to afabicin, which acts as an inhibitor of the bacterial enzyme enoyl-acyl carrier protein reductase (FabI). It is being researched as a potential treatment for infections by drug-resistant strains of bacteria such as Staphylococcus aureus, Klebsiella pneumoniae and Pseudomonas aeruginosa.
