= Alisporivir =

Chemical compound

Clinical data
- ATC code: None

Identifiers
- CAS Number: 254435-95-5
- PubChem CID: 11513676
- ChemSpider: 9688467
- UNII: VBP9099AA6
- KEGG: D10087
- ChEMBL: ChEMBL1651956
- NIAID ChemDB: 268533
- ECHA InfoCard: 100.234.903

Chemical and physical data
- Formula: C_{63}H_{113}N_{11}O_{12}
- Molar mass: 1216.662 g·mol^{−1}
- 3D model (JSmol): Interactive image
- SMILES: O=C1N[C@H](C(=O)N(C)[C@H](C(=O)N[C@H](C(=O)N[C@@H](C(=O)N(C)[C@H](C(=O)N(C)[C@H](C(=O)N(C)[C@H](C(=O)N([C@H](C(=O)N[C@H](C(=O)N(C)[C@@H](C(=O)N(CC)[C@H]1C(C)C)C)CC)[C@H](O)[C@H](C)C/C=C/C)C)C(C)C)CC(C)C)CC(C)C)C)C)CC(C)C)C(C)C
- InChI: InChI=1S/C63H113N11O12/c1-26-29-30-40(16)52(75)51-56(79)66-44(27-2)59(82)68(20)43(19)58(81)74(28-3)49(38(12)13)55(78)67-48(37(10)11)62(85)69(21)45(31-34(4)5)54(77)64-41(17)53(76)65-42(18)57(80)70(22)46(32-35(6)7)60(83)71(23)47(33-36(8)9)61(84)72(24)50(39(14)15)63(86)73(51)25/h26,29,34-52,75H,27-28,30-33H2,1-25H3,(H,64,77)(H,65,76)(H,66,79)(H,67,78)/b29-26+/t40-,41+,42-,43-,44+,45+,46+,47+,48+,49+,50+,51+,52-/m1/s1; Key:OLROWHGDTNFZBH-XEMWPYQTSA-N

Alisporivir (INN), or Debio 025, DEB025, (or UNIL-025) is a cyclophilin inhibitor. Its structure is reminiscent of and synthesized from ciclosporin.

It inhibits cyclophilin A. Alisporivir is not immunosuppressive.

It is being researched for potential use in the treatment of hepatitis C. It has also been investigated for Duchenne muscular dystrophy and may have therapeutic potential in Alzheimer's disease.

Alisporivir is under development by Debiopharm for Japan and by Novartis for the rest of the world (licence granted by Debiopharm) since February 2010.
