= 2,7-Dimethylnaphthalene =

Names
- Preferred IUPAC name 2,7-Dimethylnaphthalene

Identifiers
| CAS Number | 582-16-1 |
| 3D model (JSmol) | Interactive image |
| ChEBI | CHEBI:48632 |
| ChEMBL | ChEMBL195036 |
| ChemSpider | 10918 |
| ECHA InfoCard | 100.008.617 |
| EC Number | 209-477-1 |
| PubChem CID | 11396 |
| UNII | ON63XH5BQ4 |
| CompTox Dashboard (EPA) | DTXSID7060386 |
- InChI: Key: YGYNBBAUIYTWBF-UHFFFAOYSA-N
- SMILES: CC1=CC2=C(C=C1)C=CC(=C2)C

Properties
| Chemical formula | C_{12}H_{12} |
| Molar mass | 156.228 g·mol^{−1} |
| Appearance | white solid |
| Melting point | 95–96 °C (203–205 °F; 368–369 K) |
- Except where otherwise noted, data are given for materials in their standard state (at 25 °C [77 °F], 100 kPa). Infobox references

2,7-Dimethylnaphthalene (2,7-DMN) is an organic compound with the formula C_{10}H_{6}(CH_{3})_{2}. It is one of the ten isomers of dimethylnaphthalene. Alkylated naphthalenes are obtained from coal tar. It can be obtained from 2,7-dihydroxynaphthalene. It reacts with N-bromosuccinimide to give 2,7-bis(bromomethyl)naphthalene.
