= 1,8-Naphthalic anhydride =

Names
- Preferred IUPAC name 1H,3H-Naphtho[1,8-cd]pyran-1,3-dione
- Other names 1,8-Naphthalenedicarboxylic acid anhydride

Identifiers
| CAS Number | 81-84-5 |
| 3D model (JSmol) | Interactive image |
| ChEBI | CHEBI:82246 |
| ChEMBL | ChEMBL316059 |
| ChemSpider | 6438 |
| ECHA InfoCard | 100.001.256 |
| EC Number | 201-380-2 |
| KEGG | C19125 |
| PubChem CID | 6693 |
| UNII | 32RS852X55 |
| CompTox Dashboard (EPA) | DTXSID4026505 |
- InChI: InChI=1S/C12H6O3/c13-11-8-5-1-3-7-4-2-6-9(10(7)8)12(14)15-11/h1-6H Key: GRSMWKLPSNHDHA-UHFFFAOYSA-N
- SMILES: C1=CC2=C3C(=C1)C(=O)OC(=O)C3=CC=C2

Properties
| Chemical formula | C_{12}H_{6}O_{3} |
| Molar mass | 198.177 g·mol^{−1} |
| Appearance | white solid |
| Melting point | 269–276 °C (516–529 °F; 542–549 K) |

Hazards
- GHS labelling
| Pictograms | (GHS07: Exclamation mark) |
| Signal word | Warning |
| Hazard statements | H315, H317, H319, H335 |
| Precautionary statements | P261, P264, P271, P272, P280, P302+P352, P304+P340, P305+P351+P338, P312, P321, P332+P313, P333+P313, P337+P313, P362, P363, P403+P233, P405, P501 |
- Except where otherwise noted, data are given for materials in their standard state (at 25 °C [77 °F], 100 kPa). Infobox references

1,8-Naphthalic anhydride is an organic compound with the formula C_{10}H_{6}(C_{2}O_{3}). It is one of three isomers of naphthalic anhydride, the other two being the 1,2- and the 2,3-derivatives. The 1,8-isomer is prepared by aerobic oxidation of acenaphthene.

== Derivatives ==
Hydrolysis gives 1,8-naphthalenedicarboxylic acid. Heating that diacid induces isomerization to 2,6-naphthalenedicarboxylic acid.

1,8-Naphthalic anhydride is a precursor to the 4-chloro and 4,5-dichloro derivatives. These chloride groups are susceptible to displacement by amines and alkoxides, giving rise, ultimately, to a large family of naphthalimides, which are used as optical brighteners.

Hydride reduction of naphthalic anhydride gives 1,8-bis(hydroxymethyl)naphthalene, a precursor to 1,8-dimethylnaphthalene

Derivatives includes the drug Alrestatin.
