= Dimethylnaphthalene =

Dimethylnaphthalene may refer to:

- 1,2-Dimethylnaphthalene (1,2-DMN)
- 1,3-Dimethylnaphthalene (1,3-DMN)
- 1,4-Dimethylnaphthalene (1,4-DMN)
- 1,5-Dimethylnaphthalene (1,5-DMN)
- 1,6-Dimethylnaphthalene (1,6-DMN)
- 1,7-Dimethylnaphthalene (1,7-DMN)
- 1,8-Dimethylnaphthalene (1,8-DMN)
- 2,3-Dimethylnaphthalene (2,3-DMN)
- 2,6-Dimethylnaphthalene (2,6-DMN)
- 2,7-Dimethylnaphthalene (2,7-DMN)
