= Afabicin =

Chemical compound

Clinical data
- Other names: AFN-1720; Debio1450

Legal status
- Legal status: Investigational

Identifiers
- IUPAC name: [6-[(E)-3-[methyl-[(3-methyl-1-benzofuran-2-yl)methyl]amino]-3-oxoprop-1-enyl]-2-oxo-3,4-dihydro-1,8-naphthyridin-1-yl]methyl dihydrogen phosphate
- CAS Number: 1518800-35-5
- PubChem CID: 72696796
- IUPHAR/BPS: 10754
- DrugBank: DB15268
- ChemSpider: 58827798
- UNII: DMM8663H2R
- ChEMBL: ChEMBL4297501

Chemical and physical data
- Formula: C_{23}H_{24}N_{3}O_{7}P
- Molar mass: 485.433 g·mol^{−1}
- 3D model (JSmol): Interactive image
- SMILES: CC1=C(OC2=CC=CC=C12)CN(C)C(=O)/C=C/C3=CC4=C(N=C3)N(C(=O)CC4)COP(=O)(O)O
- InChI: InChI=1S/C23H24N3O7P/c1-15-18-5-3-4-6-19(18)33-20(15)13-25(2)21(27)9-7-16-11-17-8-10-22(28)26(23(17)24-12-16)14-32-34(29,30)31/h3-7,9,11-12H,8,10,13-14H2,1-2H3,(H2,29,30,31)/b9-7+; Key:HFYMDQMXVPJNTH-VQHVLOKHSA-N

Afabicin (Debio 1450) is an experimental antibiotic developed by Debiopharm for the treatment of Staphylococcus aureus infections. It is a prodrug which is converted in vivo into the active form afabicin desphosphono (Debio 1452) which acts as an inhibitor of the staphylococcal enoyl-acyl carrier protein reductase (FabI) enzyme. It has shown similar efficacy in clinical trials to established drugs such as vancomycin, but has not yet been approved for clinical use.

== See also ==
- Mupirocin
- Nilofabicin
