= Amonafide =

Chemical compound

Clinical data
- Trade names: Xanafide, Quinamed
- ATC code: none

Identifiers
- IUPAC name: 5-amino-2-[2-(dimethylamino)ethyl]-1H-benzo[de]isoquinoline-1,3(2H)-dione
- CAS Number: 69408-81-7
- PubChem CID: 50515
- ChemSpider: 45804
- UNII: 1Q8D39N37L
- KEGG: D10090
- ChEMBL: ChEMBL428676
- CompTox Dashboard (EPA): DTXSID30219562

Chemical and physical data
- Formula: C_{16}H_{17}N_{3}O_{2}
- Molar mass: 283.331 g·mol^{−1}
- 3D model (JSmol): Interactive image
- SMILES: O=C2c1c3c(ccc1)cc(cc3C(=O)N2CCN(C)C)N
- InChI: InChI=1S/C16H17N3O2/c1-18(2)6-7-19-15(20)12-5-3-4-10-8-11(17)9-13(14(10)12)16(19)21/h3-5,8-9H,6-7,17H2,1-2H3; Key:UPALIKSFLSVKIS-UHFFFAOYSA-N

Amonafide (originally AS1413) (INN, trade names Quinamed and Xanafide) was a drug that was being studied in the treatment of cancer. It belongs to a novel family of chemotherapeutic drugs called Naphthalimides and is a potential topoisomerase inhibitor and DNA intercalator.

It was being developed as an anti-cancer therapy by Antisoma.

As of 2008, it is in Phase III clinical trials. e.g. In March 2010 it is Phase III trial against secondary acute myeloid leukaemia (AML). In June 2010, it gained an FDA Fast Track Status for the treatment of Secondary Acute Myeloid Leukaemia.

== See also ==
- Alrestatin
