= Aleplasinin =

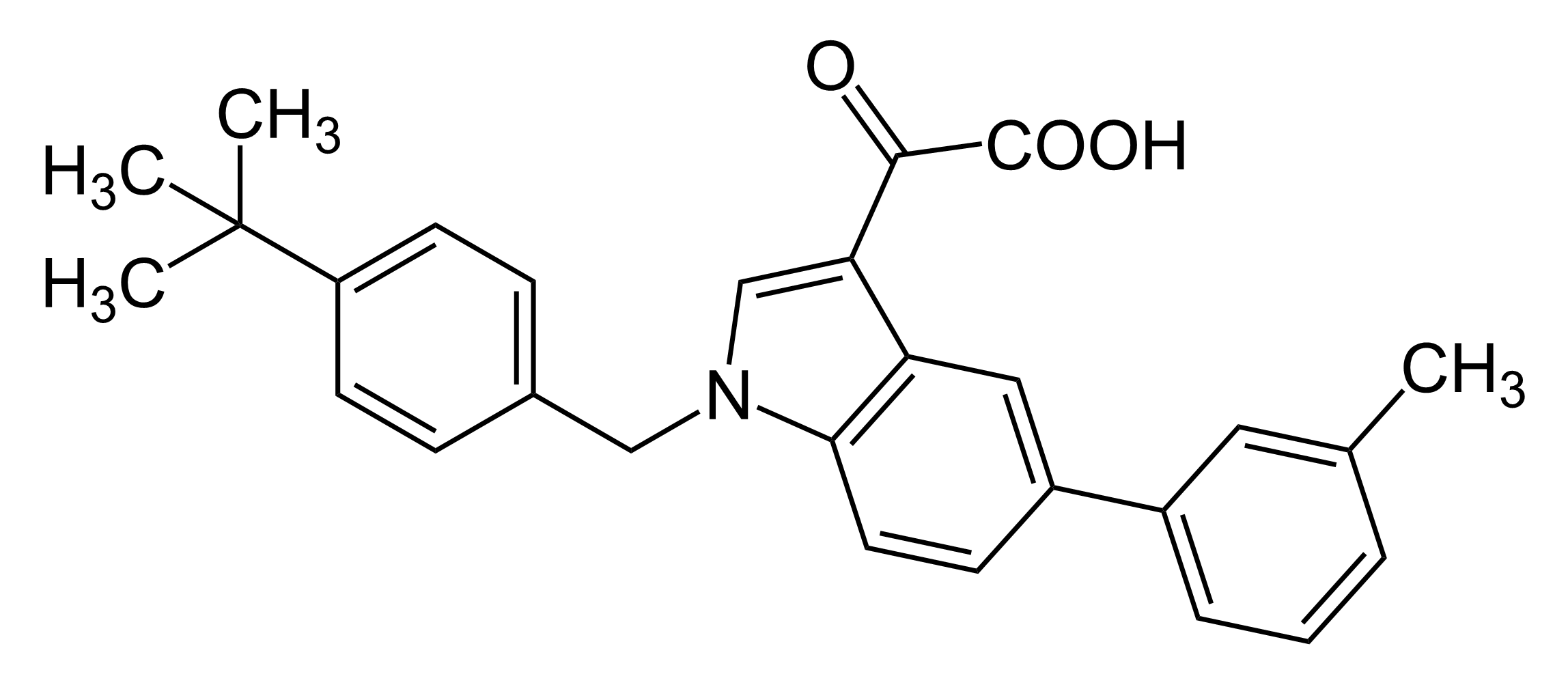

Identifiers
| CAS Number | 481629-87-2 |
| 3D model (JSmol) | Interactive image |
| ChEBI | CHEBI:230707 |
| ChEMBL | ChEMBL325424 |
| ChemSpider | 8399758 |
| DrugBank | DB12635 |
| KEGG | D08656 |
| PubChem CID | 10224267 |
| UNII | LL56J87F3X |
| CompTox Dashboard (EPA) | DTXSID80197447 |
- InChI: InChI=1S/C28H27NO3/c1-18-6-5-7-20(14-18)21-10-13-25-23(15-21)24(26(30)27(31)32)17-29(25)16-19-8-11-22(12-9-19)28(2,3)4/h5-15,17H,16H2,1-4H3,(H,31,32) Key: HSXLMAFNWCSZGP-UHFFFAOYSA-N
- SMILES: CC1=CC(=CC=C1)C2=CC3=C(C=C2)N(C=C3C(=O)C(=O)O)CC4=CC=C(C=C4)C(C)(C)C

Properties
| Chemical formula | C_{28}H_{27}NO_{3} |
| Molar mass | 425.5 g·mol^{−1} |
- Except where otherwise noted, data are given for materials in their standard state (at 25 °C [77 °F], 100 kPa). Infobox references

Aleplasinin is an experimental drug belonging to the class of plasminogen activator inhibitors (PAI-1 inhibitors). It is being developed by the U.S. pharmaceutical company Wyeth for potential use in the treatment of Alzheimer's disease.

== Mechanism of action ==
In Alzheimer's disease, senile plaques composed of misfolded beta-amyloid peptides accumulate within neurons, together with neurofibrils. This accumulation leads to necrosis of the nerve cells.

The beta-amyloid peptide activates the tissue-specific plasminogen activator tPA (tissue plasminogen activator), which in turn activates plasminogen, thereby inducing the formation of plasmin. Plasmin promotes the degradation of beta-amyloid.

tPA, however, is inhibited by the plasminogen activator inhibitor PAI-1. In Alzheimer's disease, this inhibitor exhibits markedly increased activity. Aleplasinin selectively inhibits PAI-1, thereby preventing the enzyme inhibition of tPA. As a result, the degradation of the beta-amyloid peptide is enhanced, preventing its aggregation with neurofibrils in nerve cells. This process helps to prevent neuronal necrosis.

== Literatur ==
- J.S. Jacobsen et al., M.N. Pangalos: Enhanced clearance of Aβ in brain by sustaining the plasmin proteolysis cascade, in: Proceedings Natural Academy Sciences, 2008, 105, S. 8754–8759; doi:10.1073/pnas.0710823105
- American Medical Association:
