= 1,8-Dimethylnaphthalene =

Identifiers
CAS Number	569-41-5
3D model (JSmol)	Interactive image
Beilstein Reference	2039841
ChEBI	CHEBI:48610
ChemSpider	10813
ECHA InfoCard	100.008.469
EC Number	209-314-4
KEGG	C14703
PubChem CID	11287
UNII	22P9FW1L76
CompTox Dashboard (EPA)	DTXSID6060347
- InChI: InChI=1S/C12H12/c1-9-5-3-7-11-8-4-6-10(2)12(9)11/h3-8H,1-2H3 Key: YGYNBBAUIYTWBF-UHFFFAOYSA-N
- SMILES: CC1=C2C(=CC=CC2=CC=C1)C

Properties
Chemical formula	C_{12}H_{12}
Molar mass	156.228 g·mol^{−1}
Appearance	white solid
Melting point	59–61 °C (138–142 °F; 332–334 K)
- Except where otherwise noted, data are given for materials in their standard state (at 25 °C [77 °F], 100 kPa). Infobox references

1,8-Dimethylnaphthalene (1,8-DMN) is an organic compound with the formula C_{10}H_{6}(CH_{3})_{2}. It is one of the ten isomers of dimethylnaphthalene. Methylated naphthalenes are typically obtained from coal tar. The concentration of 1,8-dimethylnaphthalene have attracted interest as markers of the age of a petroleum. 1,8-Dimethylnaphthalene isomerizes to 1,7-dimethylnaphthalene when heated near 360 °C in the presence of clays.
