= Alafosfalin =

Names
- IUPAC name ((1R)-1-(((2S)-2-Aminopropanoyl)amino]ethyl)phosphonic acid
- Other names Alaphosphin

Identifiers
CAS Number	60668-24-8
3D model (JSmol)	Interactive image
ChemSpider	64964
ECHA InfoCard	100.056.675
PubChem CID	71957
UNII	0M8OM373BS
CompTox Dashboard (EPA)	DTXSID6046393
- InChI: InChI=1S/C5H13N2O4P/c1-3(6)5(8)7-4(2)12(9,10)11/h3-4H,6H2,1-2H3,(H,7,8)(H2,9,10,11)/t3-,4+/m0/s1 Key: BHAYDBSYOBONRV-IUYQGCFVSA-N; InChI=1/C5H13N2O4P/c1-3(6)5(8)7-4(2)12(9,10)11/h3-4H,6H2,1-2H3,(H,7,8)(H2,9,10,11)/t3-,4+/m0/s1 Key: BHAYDBSYOBONRV-IUYQGCFVBQ
- SMILES: C[C@@H](C(=O)N[C@@H](C)P(=O)(O)O)N

Properties
Chemical formula	C_{5}H_{13}N_{2}O_{4}P
Molar mass	196.143 g·mol^{−1}
Melting point	295–297 °C (563–567 °F; 568–570 K) (decomp)
- Except where otherwise noted, data are given for materials in their standard state (at 25 °C [77 °F], 100 kPa). Infobox references

Alafosfalin, also known as alaphosphin, is an phosphonodipeptide with antibacterial and antifungal properties.
