= Almecillin =

Chemical compound

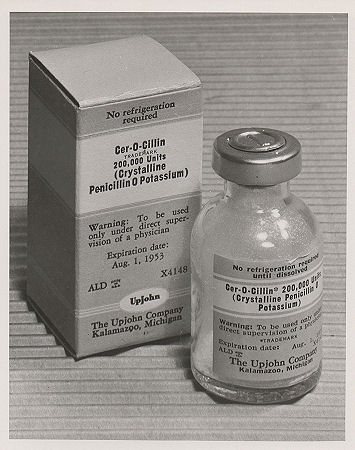

Clinical data
- Trade names: Cer-O-Cillin
- Other names: [(Allylthio)methyl]penicillin
- ATC code: None

Legal status
- Legal status: Withdrawn from Market

Identifiers
- IUPAC name: (2S,5R,6R)-3,3-dimethyl-7-oxo-6-[(2-prop-2-enylsulfanylacetyl)amino]-4-thia-1-azabicycloheptane-2-carboxylic acid
- CAS Number: 87–09–2
- PubChem CID: 71365
- ChemSpider: 64462
- UNII: 6246WH0S1O
- ChEBI: CHEBI:51207
- ChEMBL: ChEMBL2105909
- CompTox Dashboard (EPA): DTXSID50236034

Chemical and physical data
- Formula: C_{13}H_{16}N_{2}O_{4}S_{2}
- Molar mass: 328.40 g·mol^{−1}
- 3D model (JSmol): Interactive image
- SMILES: CC1(C)S[C@@H]2[C@H](NC(=O)CSCC=C)C(=O)N2[C@H]1C(=O)O
- InChI: InChI=1S/C13H18N2O4S2/c1-4-5-20-6-7(16)14-8-10(17)15-9(12(18)19)13(2,3)21-11(8)15/h4,8-9,11H,1,5-6H2,2-3H3,(H,14,16)(H,18,19)/t8-,9+,11-/m1/s1; Key:QULKGELYPOJSLP-WCABBAIRSA-N

Almecillin (INN), also known as penicillin O, was a penicillin antibiotic used to treat a number of bacterial infections in those with a penicillin allergy. This included a wide range of streptoccic, staphylococcic, pneumococcic, or gonococcic infections, with similar effect and effectiveness as Benzylpenicillin. It is obtained by isolation from Penicillium chrysogenum.

== Medical uses ==
=== Antimicrobial potency ===
As it was designed as a functional analogue to Benzylpenicillin, its antimicrobial profile is functionally identical, possessing effectiveness against Gram-positive bacteria and some limited action against Gram-negative bacteria such as Neisseria gonorrhoeae and Leptospira weilii. Despite this, some research indicated higher doses of Almecillin were required to achieve the same clearance rates, with 51% of samples in one study requiring a doubled dose to achieve growth inhibition.

=== Toxicity & allergic response ===
When compared to Benzylpenicillin, Almecillin was found to be profoundly less toxic (requiring 175,000 more units per kilogram of body weight to cause any incidence of death in rat models, and 250,000 more units to cause an irritative reaction), and found little incidence of cross-sensitivity in human case studies.

Following its market introduction; post marketing studies did not support the conclusions that had been made about allergic response, and found that many patients had a similar reaction to that of benzylpenicillin when treated with almecillin, calling into question the main benefit of its use (though the same studies continued to find evidence of reduced toxicity).

== Production ==
Production of so-called "crude" Almecillin was fairly trivial, but yielded inconsistent, and often low concentrations, with the original patent noting that crude concentrations varied from "17 to 80 percent of penicillin O". These low concentration products were unsuitable for medical use due to their variable and often low active ingredient concentration. Previous to the discovery of the model which eventually led to the medications commercial viability, high-concentration production was possible only through partition chromatography utilizing a silica gel base and Phosphate buffered ether, a process which was expensive, time-consuming, and often self defeating.

It was discovered that mixing the impure Almecillin with Chloroprocaine led the almecillin to bond with it, forming a solid crystalline salt, which would spontaneously precipitate out of the solution, increasing purity to at or near 90%.

== Marketing & market withdrawal ==
Beginning in 1951, and until 1957, Almecillin was marketed in the United States as an powder for reconstitution and injection known as Cer-O-Cillin by Upjohn. Following the withdrawal of the product by its manufacturer, it became unavailable in the United States, and approval was officially revoked by the FDA in 1997.
