= Alloclamide =

Chemical compound

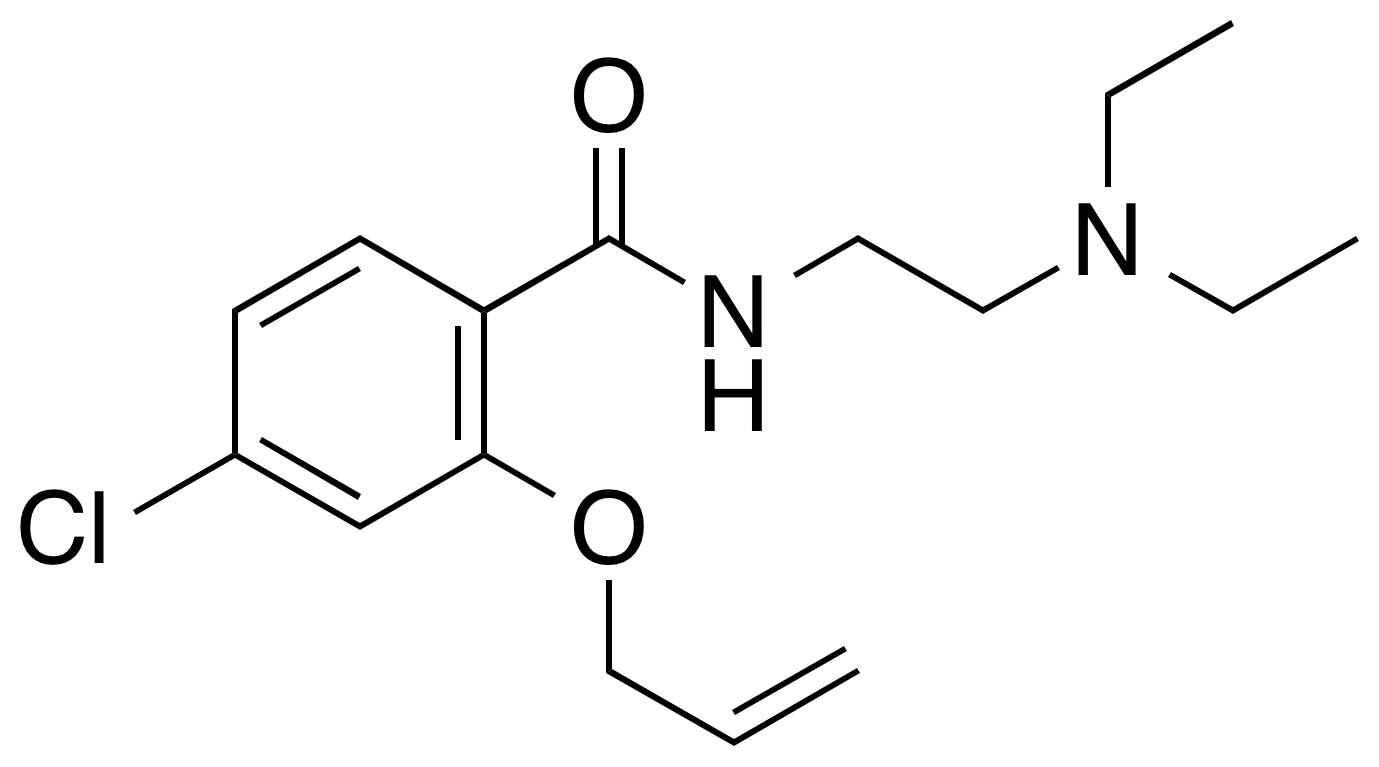

Clinical data
- Trade names: Pectex, Tuselin

Identifiers
- IUPAC name: 2-(Allyloxy)-4-chloro-N-[2-(diethylamino)ethyl]benzamide
- CAS Number: 5486-77-1
- PubChem CID: 71837
- ChemSpider: 64859
- UNII: H7B263Z7AQ
- KEGG: D01524
- ChEBI: CHEBI:135326
- ChEMBL: ChEMBL2103989
- CompTox Dashboard (EPA): DTXSID9048853

Chemical and physical data
- Formula: C_{16}H_{23}ClN_{2}O_{2}
- Molar mass: 310.82 g·mol^{−1}
- 3D model (JSmol): Interactive image
- SMILES: CCN(CC)CCNC(=O)C1=C(C=C(C=C1)Cl)OCC=C
- InChI: InChI=1S/C16H23ClN2O2/c1-4-11-21-15-12-13(17)7-8-14(15)16(20)18-9-10-19(5-2)6-3/h4,7-8,12H,1,5-6,9-11H2,2-3H3,(H,18,20); Key:UHWFVIPXDFZTFA-UHFFFAOYSA-N

Alloclamide (Pectex, Tuselin) is an antitussive and antihistamine drug marketed in Finland and Spain. It has never been marketed in the US.

It is sold as an oral solution, containing 6.25 mg/mL alloclamide. The recommended dosage for adults is 25 mg three to four times daily. Adverse effects include constipation and sedation.
