= Indium (111In) altumomab pentetate =

Indium (^{111}In) altumomab pentetate
Monoclonal antibody
- Type: Whole antibody
- Source: Mouse
- Target: CEA

Clinical data
- ATC code: none

Identifiers
- CAS Number: 156586-92-4
- ChemSpider: none
- UNII: AT2NU9VQ6M

Indium (111In) altumomab pentetate (INN; USP indium In 111 altumomab pentetate; trade name Hybri-ceaker) is a mouse monoclonal antibody linked to pentetate which acts as a chelating agent for the radioisotope indium-111. The drug is used for the diagnosis of colorectal cancer but has not been approved for use.
