= Almoxatone =

Chemical compound

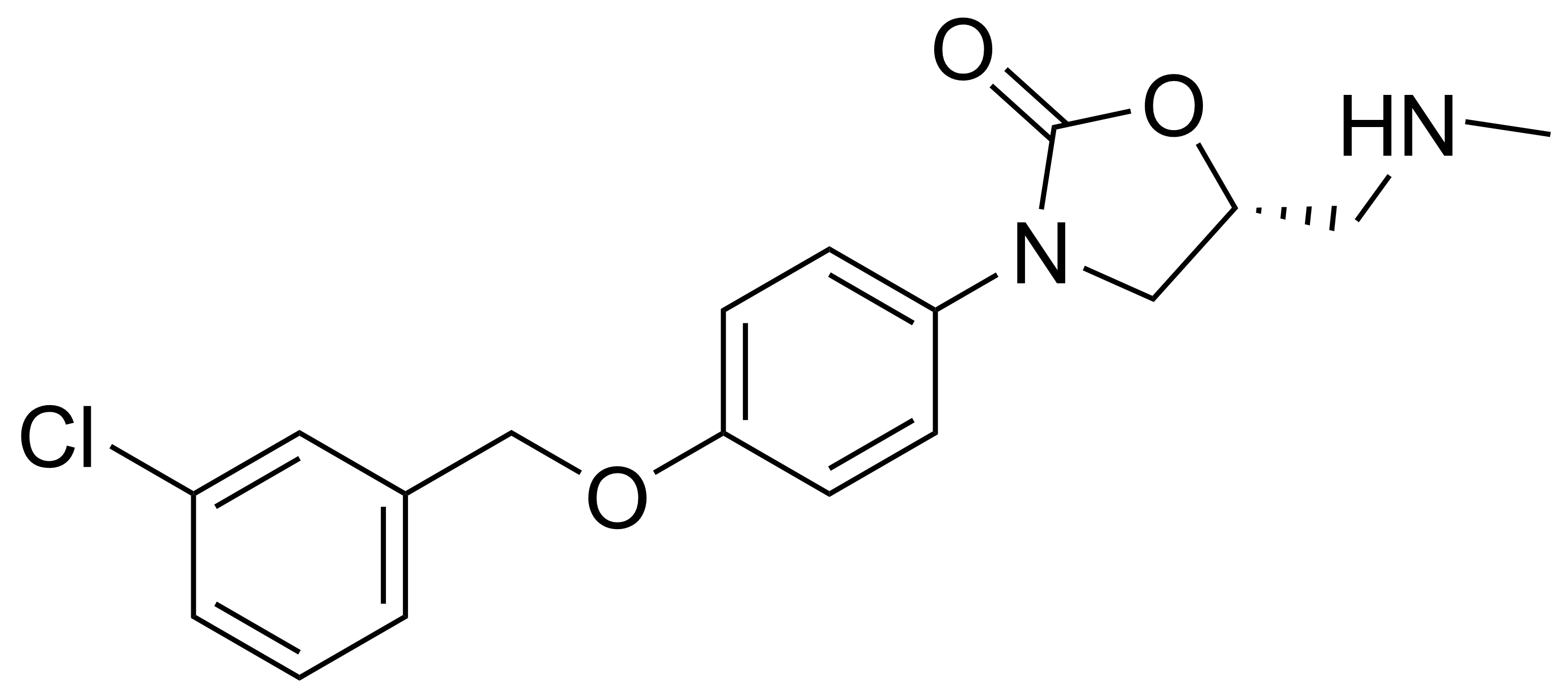

Clinical data
- ATC code: none

Legal status
- Legal status: In general: uncontrolled

Identifiers
- IUPAC name: (5R)-3-{4-[(3-chlorobenzyl)oxy]phenyl}-5-[(methylamino)methyl]-1,3-oxazolidin-2-one
- CAS Number: 84145-89-1
- PubChem CID: 172287
- ChemSpider: 150582
- UNII: 85V47MCE4Z
- ChEMBL: ChEMBL2104006
- CompTox Dashboard (EPA): DTXSID00233078

Chemical and physical data
- Formula: C_{18}H_{19}ClN_{2}O_{3}
- Molar mass: 346.81 g·mol^{−1}
- 3D model (JSmol): Interactive image
- SMILES: Clc1cccc(c1)COc3ccc(N2C(=O)O[C@H](CNC)C2)cc3
- InChI: InChI=1S/C18H19ClN2O3/c1-20-10-17-11-21(18(22)24-17)15-5-7-16(8-6-15)23-12-13-3-2-4-14(19)9-13/h2-9,17,20H,10-12H2,1H3/t17-/m1/s1; Key:KYXSTSXVEXKFJI-QGZVFWFLSA-N

Almoxatone (MD-780,236) is a selective and reversible inhibitor of MAO-B. It was patented as an antidepressant and antiparkinsonian agent but was never marketed.

== See also ==
- Monoamine oxidase inhibitor
