= Interferon alpha-n3 =

Pharmaceutical drug

Clinical data
- ATC code: none

Legal status
- Legal status: US: ℞-only

Identifiers
- PubChem SID: 46508902
- DrugBank: DB00018
- ChemSpider: none
- UNII: 47BPR3V3MP
- ChEMBL: ChEMBL2109047

Interferon alpha-n3 (Alferon-N) is a medication consisting of purified natural human interferon alpha proteins used for the treatment of genital warts.
