= Altoqualine =

Names
- Preferred IUPAC name (3S)-7-Amino-4,5,6-triethoxy-3-[(1R)-6,7,8-trimethoxy-2-methyl-1,2,3,4-tetrahydroisoquinolin-1-yl]-2-benzofuran-1(3H)-one
- Other names 458 L

Identifiers
CAS Number	121029-11-6
3D model (JSmol)	Interactive image
ChEMBL	ChEMBL2104645
ChemSpider	2301104
PubChem CID	3037346
UNII	56G228IW9Q
CompTox Dashboard (EPA)	DTXSID601030484
- InChI: InChI=1S/C27H36N2O8/c1-8-34-24-18-17(19(28)25(35-9-2)26(24)36-10-3)27(30)37-22(18)20-16-14(11-12-29(20)4)13-15(31-5)21(32-6)23(16)33-7/h13,20,22H,8-12,28H2,1-7H3/t20-,22+/m1/s1 Key: FPSZSEINEGCRIJ-IRLDBZIGSA-N; InChI=1/C27H36N2O8/c1-8-34-24-18-17(19(28)25(35-9-2)26(24)36-10-3)27(30)37-22(18)20-16-14(11-12-29(20)4)13-15(31-5)21(32-6)23(16)33-7/h13,20,22H,8-12,28H2,1-7H3/t20-,22+/m1/s1 Key: FPSZSEINEGCRIJ-IRLDBZIGBP
- SMILES: CCOC1=C(C(=C(C2=C1[C@H](OC2=O)[C@H]3C4=C(C(=C(C=C4CCN3C)OC)OC)OC)N)OCC)OCC

Properties
Chemical formula	C_{27}H_{36}N_{2}O_{8}
Molar mass	516.591 g·mol^{−1}
Melting point	144 °C (291 °F; 417 K)
- Except where otherwise noted, data are given for materials in their standard state (at 25 °C [77 °F], 100 kPa). Infobox references

Altoqualine is an isoquinoline once studied for its potential use as an antihistamine and antiallergic, but it was never a marketed drug. It is an inhibitor of histidine decarboxylase. It was only tested in men, not women.
