= Spironolactone/hydrochlorothiazide =

Medication

Combination of
- Spironolactone: Aldosterone antagonist
- Hydrochlorothiazide: Diuretic, antihypertensive

Clinical data
- Trade names: Aldactazide
- AHFS/Drugs.com: Multum Consumer Information
- MedlinePlus: a601111
- License data: US DailyMed: Spironolactone and hydrochlorothiazide
- Routes of administration: By mouth
- ATC code: C03EA01 (WHO)

Legal status
- Legal status: US: ℞-only

Identifiers
- KEGG: D10270

Spironolactone/hydrochlorothiazide, sold under the brand name Aldactazide among others, is a fixed-dose combination medication used for the treatment of hypertension (high blood pressure). It contains spironolactone, an aldosterone antagonist and potassium-sparing diuretic; and hydrochlorothiazide, a thiazide diuretic and antihypertensive.

Spironolactone/hydrochlorothiazide was approved for medical use in the United States in 1961. It is available as a generic medication.

== Medical uses ==
Spironolactone/hydrochlorothiazide is indicated for the treatment of congestive heart failure; cirrhosis of the liver accompanied by edema and/or ascites; nephrotic syndrome; and essential hypertension.

== Society and culture ==
=== Legal status ===
Spironolactone/hydrochlorothiazide was approved for medical use in the United States in 1961.

=== Names ===
Spironolactone/hydrochlorothiazide is sold under the brand name Aldactazide.
