= Alvircept sudotox =

Alvircept sudotox is a form of recombinant CD4 derived from Pneumonas aeruginosa exotoxin A, or 'PE40, which has a size of 59,187 daltons and is an anti-viral agent.
