= Alphacaine =

Alphacaine (or Alpha-Caine) is a brand name for a local anesthetic preparation used in dental procedures. It is formulated to provide temporary pain relief and numbness during treatments such as tooth extractions, fillings, and root canals.

Depending on location and manufacturer it may contain either benzocaine, articaine, or lidocaine (with or without adrenaline).
