= Albutoin =

Anticonvulsant compound

Clinical data
- Other names: BAX-422Z

Identifiers
- IUPAC name: 3-Allyl-5-isobutyl-2-thioxo-4-imidazolidinone
- CAS Number: 830-89-7
- PubChem CID: 3032361
- ChemSpider: 2297355
- UNII: 475NGR2DC1

Chemical and physical data
- Formula: C_{10}H_{16}N_{2}OS
- Molar mass: 212.31 g·mol^{−1}
- 3D model (JSmol): Interactive image
- SMILES: S=C1N(C(=O)C(N1)CC(C)C)C\C=C

Albutoin is an anticonvulsant. It was marketed in Europe as CO-ORD and Euprax by Baxter Laboratories. It was evaluated by the United States Food and Drug Administration, but not approved.
