= Scriptaid =

Chemical compound

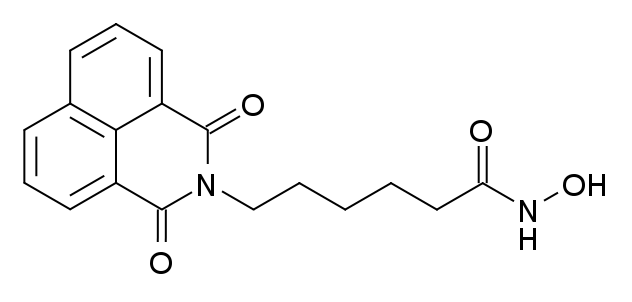

Clinical data
- ATC code: none

Identifiers
- IUPAC name: 6-(1,3-Dioxobenzo[de]isoquinolin-2-yl)-N-hydroxyhexanamide
- CAS Number: 287383-59-9
- PubChem CID: 5186
- ChemSpider: 4998
- UNII: EJQ8CD8BSV
- CompTox Dashboard (EPA): DTXSID70274458

Chemical and physical data
- Formula: C_{18}H_{18}N_{2}O_{4}
- Molar mass: 326.352 g·mol^{−1}
- 3D model (JSmol): Interactive image
- SMILES: C1=CC2=C3C(=C1)C(=O)N(C(=O)C3=CC=C2)CCCCCC(=O)NO
- InChI: InChI=1S/C18H18N2O4/c21-15(19-24)10-2-1-3-11-20-17(22)13-8-4-6-12-7-5-9-14(16(12)13)18(20)23/h4-9,24H,1-3,10-11H2,(H,19,21); Key:JTDYUFSDZATMKU-UHFFFAOYSA-N

Scriptaid is a drug which acts as a histone deacetylase inhibitor, and was one of the first compounds discovered via high-throughput screening that acts at this target. Scriptaid itself was never developed for medical applications, but led to the development of structurally related drugs such as vorinostat, which have been accepted into clinical use. Most early research using these compounds focused on their anti-cancer activity, but more recent research has found scriptaid to be useful in other applications such as cloning and research into regulation of metabolism.
