= Alacizumab pegol =

Pharmaceutical drug

Monoclonal antibody
- Type: F(ab')_{2} fragment
- Source: Humanized (from mouse)
- Target: VEGFR2

Clinical data
- ATC code: none

Identifiers
- CAS Number: 934216-54-3
- ChemSpider: none
- UNII: ZL9780F883

Alacizumab pegol is an antineoplastic agent. Chemically, it is a pegylated F(ab')_{2} fragment of a monoclonal antibody.
