= Alinidine =

Chemical compound

Clinical data
- ATC code: none

Legal status
- Legal status: In general: uncontrolled

Identifiers
- IUPAC name: N-(2,6-dichlorophenyl)-N-(prop-2-en-1-yl)-4,5-dihydro-1H-imidazol-2-amine
- CAS Number: 33178-86-8
- PubChem CID: 36354
- ChemSpider: 33429
- UNII: E7IDJ8DS1D
- ChEMBL: ChEMBL278581
- CompTox Dashboard (EPA): DTXSID4022571
- ECHA InfoCard: 100.164.275

Chemical and physical data
- Formula: C_{12}H_{13}Cl_{2}N_{3}
- Molar mass: 270.16 g·mol^{−1}
- 3D model (JSmol): Interactive image
- SMILES: Clc2cccc(Cl)c2N(/C1=N/CCN1)C\C=C
- InChI: InChI=1S/C12H13Cl2N3/c1-2-8-17(12-15-6-7-16-12)11-9(13)4-3-5-10(11)14/h2-5H,1,6-8H2,(H,15,16); Key:OXTYVEUAQHPPMV-UHFFFAOYSA-N

Alinidine (ST567) is a negative chronotrope that was developed in the 1970s and 1980s. It causes bradycardia by inhibiting the pacemaker current by altering the maximal channel conductance and alter the voltage threshold. The development of alinidine was halted because it was not sufficiently specific for its target. It also has a blocking effect on calcium channels and potassium channels. It also causes elongation of re-polarisation after an action potential.

Alinidine did not improve outcomes among patients with acute myocardial infarction in a randomized controlled trial.
