= MIL-53 =

Chemical compound

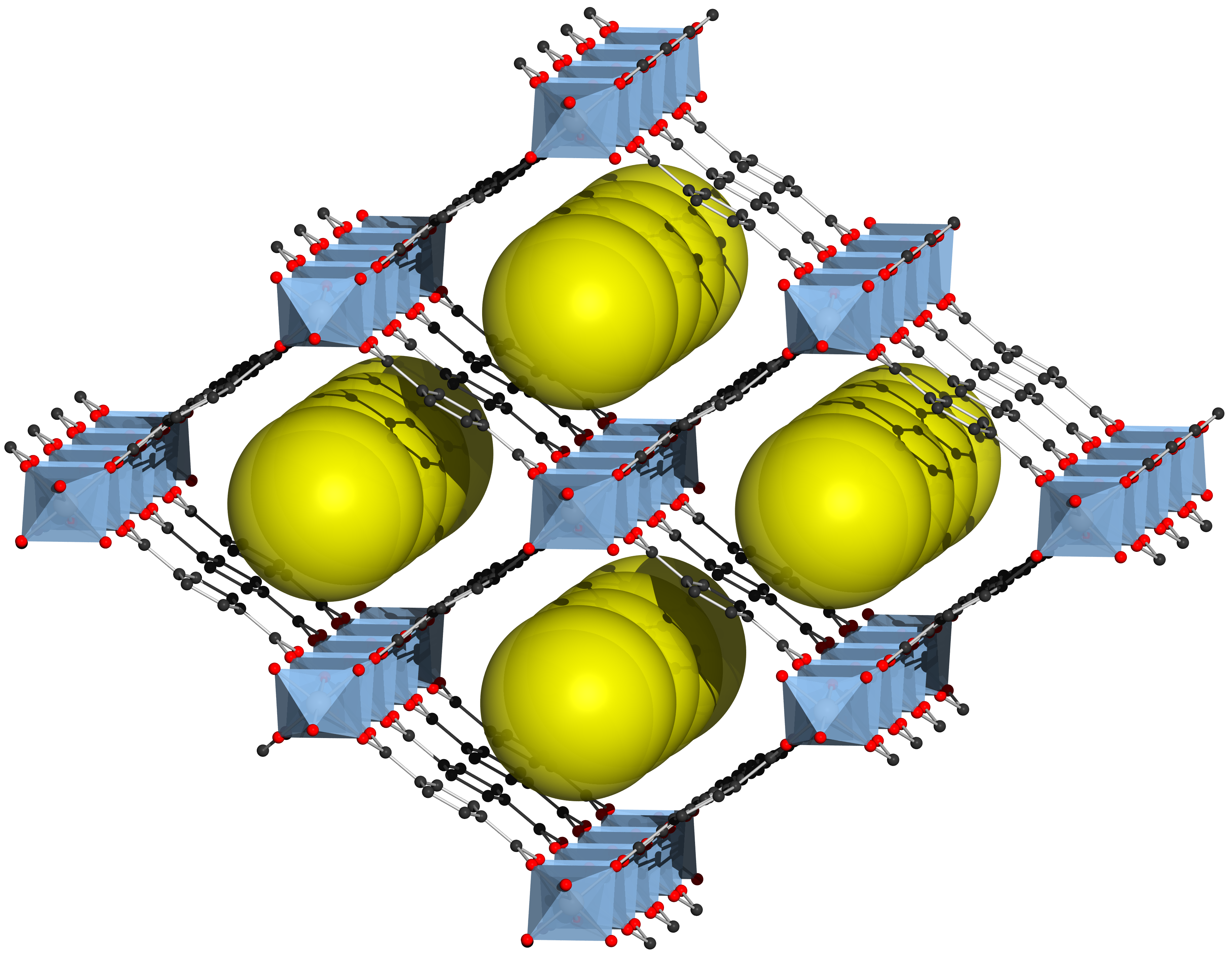
MIL-53

MIL-53 (MIL ⇒ Matériaux de l′Institut Lavoisier) belongs to the class of metal-organic framework (MOF) materials. The first synthesis and the name was established by the group of Gérard Férey in 2002. The MIL-53 structure consists of inorganic [M-OH] chains, which are connected to four neighboring inorganic chains by terephthalate-based linker molecules. Each metal center is octahedrally coordinated by six oxygen atoms. Four of these oxygen atoms originate from four different carboxylate groups and the remaining two oxygen atoms belong to two different μ-OH moieties, which bridge neighboring metal centers. The resulting framework structure contains one-dimensional diamond-shaped pores. Many research group have investigated the flexibility of the MIL-53 structure. This flexible behavior, during which the pore cross-section changes reversibly, was termed 'breathing effect' and describes the ability of the MIL-53 framework to respond to external stimuli.

== Structural Analogs ==
=== Monometallic single-linker MIL-53 analogs ===
MIL-53(Cr) was the first reported member of the MIL-53 family and is built up from Cr^{3+} as metal center and terephthalate (benzene-1,4-dicarboxylate) as linker molecules. Based on the toolbox-like design of metal-organic framework materials, different metal centers or linker molecules can be used for the synthesis of other members of the MIL-53 family. Trivalent (M^{3+}) metal centers are mainly used, but materials with divalent (M^{2+}) or tetravalent (M^{4+}) metals have also been published.

Overview of reported MIL-53(M) materials
Name	Metal center and oxidation state	Year of publication	Alternative name	Reference
MIL-53(V)	V^{3+}	2002	MIL-47	
MIL-53(V)	V^{4+}	2002	MIL-47	
MIL-53(Cr)	Cr^{3+}	2002		
MIL-53(Al)	Al^{3+}	2004		
MIL-53(Fe)	Fe^{3+}	2005		
MIL-53(Fe)	Fe^{2+}	2005		
MIL-53(In)	In^{3+}	2005		
MIL-53(Co)	Co^{2+}	2005	MOF-71	
MIL-53(Ga)	Ga^{3+}	2008		
MIL-53(Mn)	Mn^{2+}	2010		
MIL-53(Sc)	Sc^{3+}	2011		
MIL-53(Ni)	Ni^{2+}	2013		

Terephthalate was used as linker molecules in the early reports on MIL-53 materials. Later, terephthalate-based linker molecules with additional functional groups were used for the synthesis of functionalized MIL-53 materials. Apart from the two carboxylate groups of terephthalate, which are used for the formation of the framework structure, the functional linker molecules contain one or more functional groups at the benzene ring, which do not participate in the formation of the framework.

Overview of MIL-53(M) materials with functional linker molecules
Functional linker	Metal center(M)					
Functional linker	V	Cr	Al	Fe	In	Ga
2-Aminobenzene-1,4-dicarboxylate		-				
2-Fluorobenzene-1,4-dicarboxylate		-		-	-	-
2-Chlorobenzene-1,4-dicarboxylate					-	-
2-Bromobenzene-1,4-dicarboxylate		-				-
2-Iodobenzene-1,4-dicarboxylate	-	-		-	-	-
2-Nitrobenzene-1,4-dicarboxylate	-	-		-		-
Benzene-1,2,4-tricarboxylate	-	-		-	-	-
2-Methylbenzene-1,4-dicarboxylate					-	-
2-Trifluormethylbenzene-1,4-dicarboxylate		-	-	-	-	-
2-Hydroxybenzene-1,4-dicarboxylate		-		-	-	-
2-Methoxybenzene-1,4-dicarboxylate		-	-	-	-	-
2-Sulfobenzene-1,4-dicarboxylate	-	-		-	-	-
2-Isocyanatbenzene-1,4-dicarboxylate	-	-		-	-	-
2-Isothiocyanatbenzene-1,4-dicarboxylate	-	-		-	-	-
2,5-Dimethylbenzene-1,4-dicarboxylate		-	-	-	-	-
2,5-Dihydroxybenzene-1,4-dicarboxylate		-				-
2,5-Dithiolbenzene-1,4-dicarboxylate	-	-		-	-	-
2,5-Difluorobenzene-1,4-dicarboxylate		-		-	-	-
2,5-Bis(trifluormethyl)benzene-1,4-dicarboxylate		-	-		-	-
2-Amino-5-nitrobenzene-1,4-dicarboxylate	-	-		-		
Benzene-1,2,4,5-tetracarboxylate	-	-	MIL-121	MIL-82	-	-
2,3,5,6-tetramethylbenzene-1,4-dicarboxylate	-	MIL-105	-	-	-	-
2,3,5,6-Tetrachlorobenzene-1,4-dicarboxylate		-	-	-	-	-
2,3,5,6-Tetrabromobenzene-1,4-dicarboxylate		-	-	-	-	-
Naphthalene-1,4-dicarboxylate		-		-	-	-

=== Mixed-component MIL-53 analogs ===
Apart from monometallic single-linker MIL-53 analogs, which contain one type of metal and one type of linker within the framework structure, several mixed-component MIL-53 analogs were reported. In mixed-metal MIL-53 materials, two different metals are incorporated into the framework structure at crystallographically equivalent lattice positions. Since both type of metals occupy equivalent positions, the metal ratio can usually be changed independent from the framework structure. Mixed-metal MIL-53 analogs have been synthesized mainly by direct synthesis procedures under hydrothermal or solvothermal conditions.

Overview of mixed-metal MIL-53 analogs
Metal centers and oxidation states	Metal ratios [-]	Synthesis method	Citation
Al^{3+} / Cr^{3+}	0.99 : 0.01	Direct synthesis hydrothermal	
Al^{3+} / V^{4+}	0.99 : 0.01 0.95 : 0.05 0.71 : 0.29 0.32 : 0.68 0.13 : 0.87	Direct synthesis hydrothermal	
Al^{3+} / V^{4+}	?	?	
Al^{3+} / Fe^{3+}	0.85 : 0.15 0.99 : 0.01	Direct synthesis electrochemical	
Al^{3+} / Fe^{3+}	0.96 : 0.04	Post-synthetic metal-exchange	
Al^{3+} / Ga^{3+}	≈ 0.70 : 0.30 ≈ 0.85 : 0.15	Direct synthesis hydrothermal	
Cr^{3+} / V^{/4+}	0.05 : 0.95 0.10 : 0.90 0.23 : 0.77 0.50 : 0.50 0.75 : 0.25	Direct synthesis microwave	
Cr^{3+} / V^{/4+}	0.07 : 0.93 0.13 : 0.87 0.17 : 0.83 0.37 : 0.63 0.58 : 0.42	Direct synthesis solvothermal	
Cr^{3+} / Fe^{3+}	0.60 : 0.40	Direct synthesis hydrothermal	
Fe^{2+/3+} / V^{2+/3+}	0.88 : 0.12 0.76 : 0.24 0.74 : 0.26 0.49 : 0.51	Direct synthesis solvothermal	
Fe^{2+} / Mn^{2+}	0.90 : 0.10 0.88 : 0.12 0.82 : 0.18 0.74 : 0.26	Direct synthesis solvothermal	
Fe^{2+} / Co^{2+}	0.97 : 0.03 0.94 : 0.06 0.90 : 0.10	Direct synthesis solvothermal	
Fe^{2+} / Ni^{2+}	0.91 : 0.09 0.89 : 0.11 0.84 : 0.16 0.78 : 0.22	Direct synthesis solvothermal	

Similar to mixed-metal MIL-53 materials, mixed-linker MIL-53 analogs have been reported, in which two different linker molecules are incorporated into the framework structure at crystallographically equivalent positions with different ratios. One benefit of using the mixed-linker concept is that the number of functional groups in the framework can be adjusted by using different linker ratios.

Overview of mixed-linker MIL-53 analogs
Linker 1	Linker 2	Linker ratios [-]	Metal center	Synthesis method	Citation
Benzene-1,4-dicarboxylate	2-Aminobenzene-1,4-dicarboxylate	0.90 : 0.10 0.50 : 0.50 0.10 : 0.90	Al^{3+}	Direct synthesis hydrothermal	
Benzene-1,4-dicarboxylate	2-Aminobenzene-1,4-dicarboxylate	0.90 : 0.10 0.82 : 0.18 0.51 : 0.49 0.48 : 0.62	Al^{3+}	Direct synthesis hydrothermal	
Benzene-1,4-dicarboxylate	2,5-Dihydroxybenzene-1,4-dicarboxylate	0.75 : 0.25 0.50 : 0.50 0.25 : 0.75	Al^{3+}	Direct synthesis solvothermal	
Benzene-1,4-dicarboxylate	2-Iodobenzene-1,4-dicarboxylate	0.81 : 0.19 0.55 : 0.45 0.27 : 0.73	Al^{3+}	Direct synthesis hydrothermal	
