= Albifylline =

Names
- IUPAC name 1-(5-Hydroxy-5-methylhexyl)-3-methyl-7H-purine-2,6-dione

Identifiers
CAS Number	107767-55-5
3D model (JSmol)	Interactive image
ChemSpider	103197
PubChem CID	115359
UNII	A3E4BQL3WG
CompTox Dashboard (EPA)	DTXSID20148236
- InChI: InChI=1S/C13H20N4O3/c1-13(2,20)6-4-5-7-17-11(18)9-10(15-8-14-9)16(3)12(17)19/h8,20H,4-7H2,1-3H3,(H,14,15) Key: NWXULHNEYYFVMF-UHFFFAOYSA-N; InChI=1/C13H20N4O3/c1-13(2,20)6-4-5-7-17-11(18)9-10(15-8-14-9)16(3)12(17)19/h8,20H,4-7H2,1-3H3,(H,14,15) Key: NWXULHNEYYFVMF-UHFFFAOYAX
- SMILES: CC(C)(CCCCN1C(=O)C2=C(N=CN2)N(C1=O)C)O

Properties
Chemical formula	C_{13}H_{20}N_{4}O_{3}
Molar mass	280.328 g·mol^{−1}
- Except where otherwise noted, data are given for materials in their standard state (at 25 °C [77 °F], 100 kPa). Infobox references

Albifylline is a bioactive xanthine derivative similar to pentoxifylline.
