= Sulfoxone =

Chemical compound

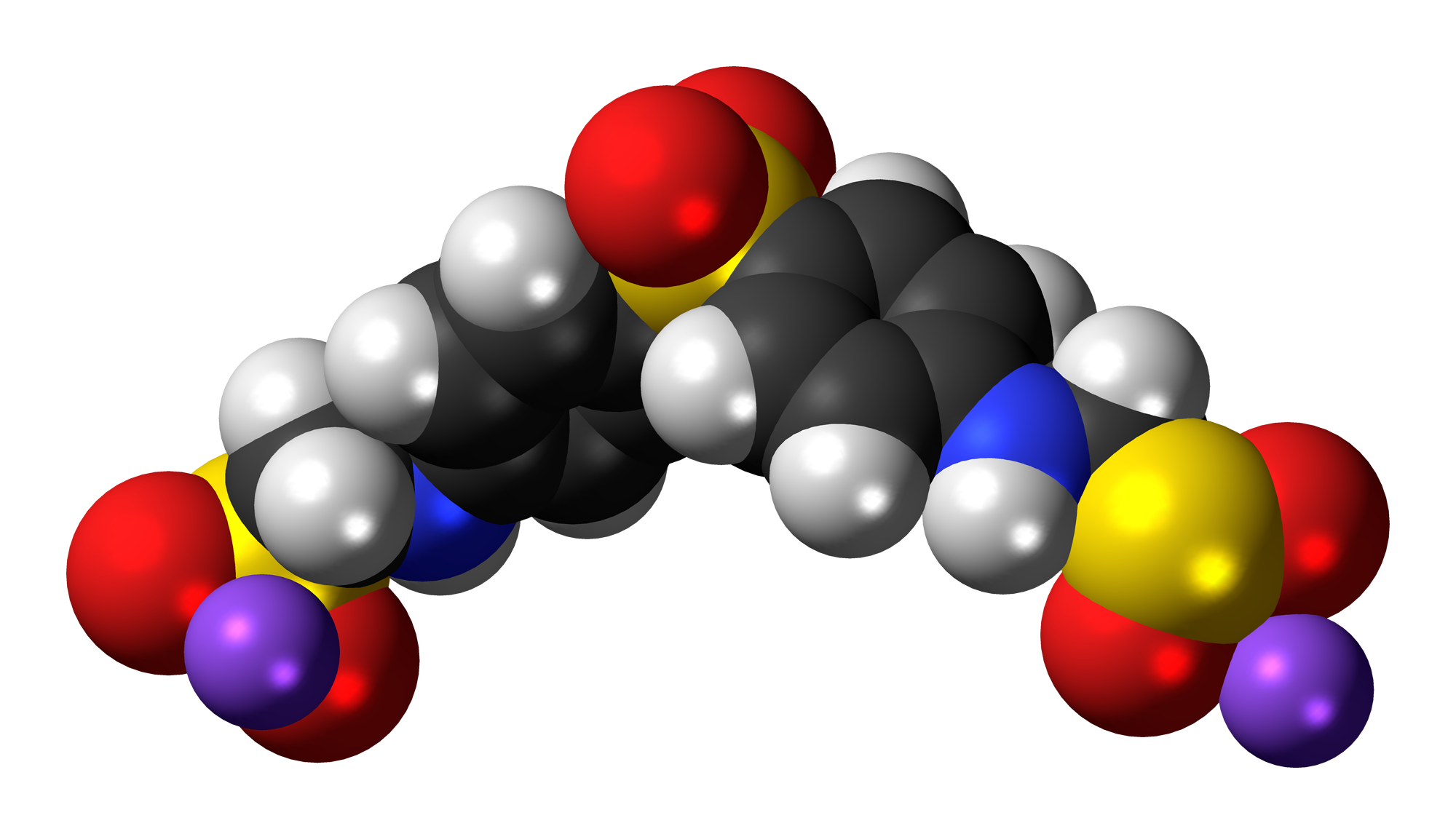

Clinical data
- Routes of administration: Oral
- ATC code: J04BA03 (WHO)

Pharmacokinetic data
- Protein binding: 69%
- Metabolism: Hepatic
- Elimination half-life: 3 to 8 hours

Identifiers
- IUPAC name: [4-[4-(sulfinomethylamino) phenyl] sulfonylphenyl] aminomethanesulfinic acid
- CAS Number: 144-75-2
- PubChem CID: 8954
- DrugBank: DB01145
- ChemSpider: 8610
- UNII: 57OWB0Q221
- KEGG: D02521
- ChEMBL: ChEMBL1200580
- CompTox Dashboard (EPA): DTXSID80162594

Chemical and physical data
- Formula: C_{14}H_{16}N_{2}Na_{2}O_{6}S_{3}
- Molar mass: 450.45 g·mol^{−1}
- 3D model (JSmol): Interactive image
- SMILES: [Na+].[Na+].[O-]S(=O)CNc1ccc(cc1)S(=O)(=O)c2ccc(NCS([O-])=O)cc2
- InChI: InChI=1S/C14H16N2O6S3.2Na/c17-23(18)9-15-11-1-5-13(6-2-11)25(21,22)14-7-3-12(4-8-14)16-10-24(19)20;;/h1-8,15-16H,9-10H2,(H,17,18)(H,19,20);;/q;2*+1/p-2; Key:AZBNFLZFSZDPQF-UHFFFAOYSA-L

Sulfoxone or aldesulfone sodium is an anti-leprosy drug. It is also known as diasone. Sulfoxone sodium was introduced in Japan in 1948. Ernest Muir introduced it to Western use while serving as superintendent of the Chacachacare Leprosarium on Trinidad in the Caribbean.
