= Debiopharm =

Swiss biopharmaceutical company

Coordinates: 46°30′54″N 6°38′28″E

- Type: Société Anonyme
- Industry: Biopharmaceutical
- Founded: Lausanne, Switzerland (1979)
- Founder: Dr Rolland-Yves Mauvernay (1922-2017)
- Headquarters: Lausanne, Switzerland
- Area served: Worldwide
- Key people: Thierry Mauvernay (President); Bertrand Ducrey (CEO Debiopharm International SA); Cédric Sager (CEO Debiopharm Research & Manufacturing SA); Marc Cikes (Managing Director Debiopharm Innovation Fund SA)
- Products: Triptorelin; Oxaliplatin
- Owner: Privately-held
- Website: www.debiopharm.com

Debiopharm is a privately-held Swiss biopharmaceutical company mainly active in development and clinical testing of drug candidates. It was founded in 1979 by Rolland-Yves Mauvernay. The company now has 2 sites in Lausanne and in Martigny, Switzerland with new building expansion projects in both locations.

== History ==
Rolland-Yves Mauvernay founded Debiopharm in 1979 in Martigny, Switzerland. In 1981, the Cytotech laboratory was created and after a few years it became Debio Recherche Pharmaceutique (R.P.), then Debiopharm Research & Manufacturing. Initially, the company worked on interferon and, in 1982, it began to focus on triptorelin, after having acquired the rights for its development from Tulane University. Triptorelin is a Gonadotropin-releasing hormone agonist (GnRH agonist) that has been approved for several indications, including advanced prostate cancer and endometriosis. The first marketing authorization for this medication was obtained in France in 1986.

In 1989, Debiopharm acquired the license for oxaliplatin, a diaminocyclohexane (DACH) platin, from Nagoya City University. The drug was first approved in Europe in 1996 and became a standard treatment in metastatic colorectal cancer. Since launch, triptorelin and oxaliplatin have generated several billion dollars in revenue for the company.

Since 2004, after having occupied different premises in Lausanne, Debiopharm moved its headquarters to a new building: what became "Après-demain Forum" had been initially designed by architect Jean Tschumi as the headquarters commodity trading giant Andre and is a cultural property of national significance.

In 2005, Debiopharm acquired the Canadian company H3 Pharma, rebranded Debiovision, to support the development and worldwide registration of its medicines.

The company's business model relies on establishing partnerships and research agreements with other companies or universities to develop new molecules and run clinical trials before licensing them in case of success. It partnered for instance in 2009 with US-based MSM Protein Technologies to work on a new oncology treatment, in 2011 with Yale University as part of an agreement to develop and commercialise medicine for autoimmune and inflammatory diseases, in 2014 with German company Evotec to identify and develop compounds to treat a variety of cancers, or with Canadian company Nobelex Biotech (also in 2014) to develop antibiotics targeting Neisseria gonorrhoeae and enteric species.

In March 2021, Merck KGaA announced the acquisition of Debiopharm's xevinapant program in head and neck cancer for 900 million euros, then dropped the project in 2024.

In September 2024, Isotope Technologies Munich (ITM) announced the exclusive global license for the clinical and commercial development of Debioharm's radiopharmaceutical peptide-based, theranostic pair ITM-91/ITM-94D (Debio 0328/0228).

== Structure and subsidiaries ==
Debiopharm is the Life Science division of the holding company Après-demain (litt. "The Day after Tomorrow") with three subsidiaries active in drug development (Debiopharm International), drug manufacturing (Debiopharm Research & Manufacturing) and investment (Debiopharm Innovation Fund):

- Debiopharm International in-licenses product candidates or technologies, develops them into medicines, and then licenses them to third parties for commercialization. This subsidiary is mainly focused on the development of medicines in the fields of oncology and infectious diseases, from preclinical development to full approval of new treatments.
- Debiopharm Research & Manufacturing (formerly known as Debio R.P.), based in Martigny, Switzerland, is a pharmaceutical research, development and production company. The Swissmedic-certified production site was renovated and expanded in 2015. Debiopharm Research & Manufacturing provides contract manufacturing and contract research services to Debiopharm.
- Debiopharm Innovation Fund provides venture capital for Digital Health companies. The Fund notably invested in Carevive (US-based oncology-focused technology company) in 2020, VivoSense (medical technology) in 2022 and Iktos (artificial intelligence applied to new drug discoveries) in 2023. It also successfully exited Finnish oncology startup Kaiku Health, which was bought in 2020 by Swedish giant Elekta.

Until 2020, the subsidiary Debiopharm Investment SA managed the group's asset management activities. This subsidiary was merged and its former activities are now directly taken over by the holding company Après-demain SA.

== Products ==
Debiopharm is known for the development of triptorelin and oxaliplatin, two drugs that became standards of care for the treatment of various types of cancer and are listed on the World Health Organization's List of Essential Medicines.

=== Currently marketed ===
- Triptorelin is a gonadotropin-releasing hormone agonist (GnRH agonist) approved for several indications, including prostate cancer and endometriosis, under the names Decapeptyl, Neo Decapeptyl, Trelstar and Pamorelin. This molecule is also marketed in several European countries as Salvacyl and Moapar as a three-month treatment for sexual deviance.
- Oxaliplatin is a diaminocyclohexane (DACH)-platinum which has become a standard treatment for colorectal cancers, as well as gastric and liver cancers under the names Eloxatin (marketed by Sanofi), Elplat, Dacotin or Dacplat.

=== Under development ===
Early-stage treatments being developed by Debiopharm are referred to by code names such as "Debio [+4 digit number]". In 2020, Debiopharm signed a global license and research agreement with German biotech 3B Pharmaceuticals (3BP) to work on "Debio 0228", a treatment targeting the CAIX (Carbonic anhydrase 9) enzyme to fight the progression of cancer. As part of their partnership-focused business model, in 2024, Debio 0228 was out-licensed to ITM Isotope Technologies Munich.

Other drug candidates under development include:

- Xevinapant is a potent, orally available inhibitor of apoptosis proteins. xevinapant has proven to be efficient in high-risk patients with locally advanced squamous-cell carcinoma of the head and neck (LASCCHN). In March 2021, an exclusive license agreement has been granted to Merck KGaA for 900 million euros for further development and commercialisation of xevinapant. Merck dropped the project in 2024.
- Afabicin is an enoyl-acyl carrier protein reductase inhibitor and an antistaphylococcal antibiotic, to address acute bacterial skin and skin structure infections.
- Zedoresertib (Debio 0123), a WEE1 inhibitor for the treatment of glioblastoma.
- Debio 1562M, a second-generation ADC directed against CD37 and including Multilink cleavable linker-payload technology in pre-clinical research for the treatment of some blood cancers including Acute Myeloid Leukemia (AML) and Myelodysplastic syndromes (MDS)
- Debio 4126, a sustained-release formulation of somatostatin analogue (SSA) therapy for the treatment of acromegaly
- Debio 4326 a gonadotropin-releasing hormone agonist therapy for central precocious puberty
- Lunresertib (Debio 2513), a PKMYT1 inhibitor, designed to exploit specific genetic vulnerabilities in solid tumors, such as CCNE1 amplification. In 2026, U.S. Food and Drug Administration (FDA) has granted Fast Track designation to the combination of lunresertib (Debio2513), and zedoresertib (Debio 0123) for genomic-defined platinum-resistant ovarian cancer.
