= 1,4-Dimethylnaphthalene =

Names
- Preferred IUPAC name 1,4-Dimethylnaphthalene

Identifiers
| CAS Number | 571-58-4 |
| 3D model (JSmol) | Interactive image |
| ChEBI | CHEBI:48609 |
| ChEMBL | ChEMBL362076 |
| ChemSpider | 10829 |
| ECHA InfoCard | 100.008.488 |
| EC Number | 209-335-9 |
| PubChem CID | 11304 |
| UNII | BQH3S1I0SO |
| CompTox Dashboard (EPA) | DTXSID8035423 |
- InChI: InChI=1S/C12H12/c1-9-7-8-10(2)12-6-4-3-5-11(9)12/h3-8H,1-2H3 Key: APQSQLNWAIULLK-UHFFFAOYSA-N
- SMILES: CC1=CC=C(C2=CC=CC=C12)C

Properties
| Chemical formula | C_{12}H_{12} |
| Molar mass | 156.228 g·mol^{−1} |
| Melting point | 7.6 °C (45.7 °F; 280.8 K) |
| Boiling point | 268 °C (514 °F; 541 K) |
- Except where otherwise noted, data are given for materials in their standard state (at 25 °C [77 °F], 100 kPa). Infobox references

1,4-Dimethylnaphthalene (1,4DMN) is a plant growth regulator that occurs naturally in potato tubers, preventing them from sprouting. Synthetic forms such as 1,4SIGHT are applied to potatoes during storage.

Although discovered in the 1970s, it was not used commercially in the USA until 1996 and in Europe until 2015.
