= 2,6-Naphthalenedicarboxylic acid =

Names
- Preferred IUPAC name Naphthalene-2,6-dicarboxylic acid
- Other names 2,6-Naphthalenedicarboxylic acid

Identifiers
CAS Number	1141-38-4
3D model (JSmol)	Interactive image
ChEBI	CHEBI:44460
ChemSpider	13718
ECHA InfoCard	100.013.206
EC Number	214-527-0
PubChem CID	14357
UNII	K3C4DYZ29O
CompTox Dashboard (EPA)	DTXSID5029211
- InChI: InChI=1S/C12H8O4/c13-11(14)9-3-1-7-5-10(12(15)16)4-2-8(7)6-9/h1-6H,(H,13,14)(H,15,16) Key: RXOHFPCZGPKIRD-UHFFFAOYSA-N
- SMILES: C1=CC2=C(C=CC(=C2)C(=O)O)C=C1C(=O)O

Properties
Chemical formula	C_{12}H_{8}O_{4}
Molar mass	216.192 g·mol^{−1}
Appearance	colorless solid
- Except where otherwise noted, data are given for materials in their standard state (at 25 °C [77 °F], 100 kPa). Infobox references

2,6-Naphthalenedicarboxylic acid is an organic compound with the formula C_{10}H_{6}(CO_{2}H)_{2}. This colorless solid is one of several isomers of naphthalenedicarboxylic acid. It is a precursor to the high performance polyester polyethylene naphthalate (PEN, poly(ethylene-2,6-naphthalene dicarboxylate)). It is also used in the synthesis of some metal-organic frameworks.

== Preparation ==
It was first prepared by Robert Evert and Victor Merz in 1876 by hydrolysis of 2,6-dicyanonaphthalene.

1,8-Naphthalenedicarboxylic acid can be isomerized to 2,6-naphthalenedicarboxylic acid via the intermediacy of the dipotassium dicarboxylates. It is also produced by oxidation of 2,6-diisopropylnaphthalene.
