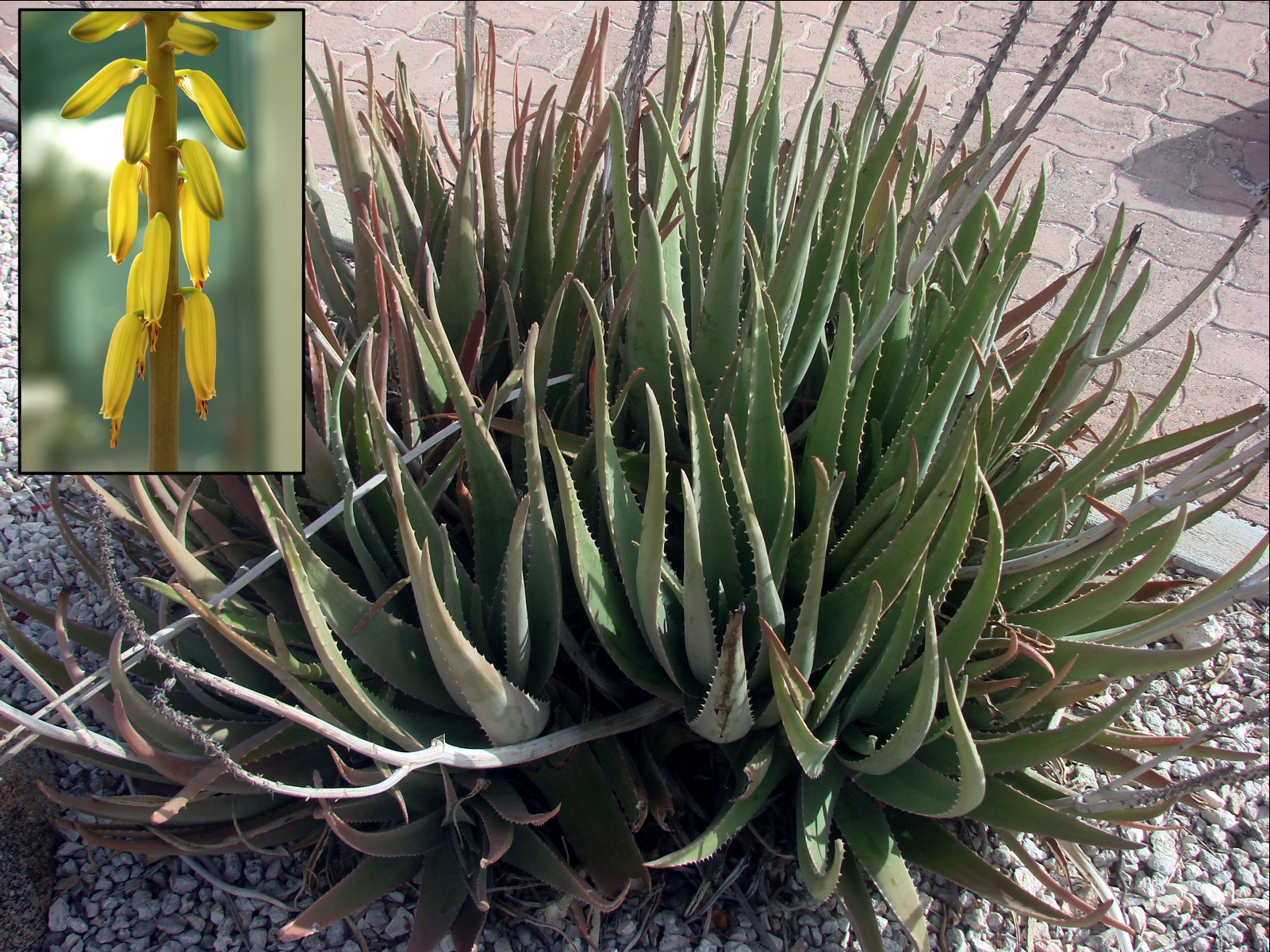
- Plant with flower detail inset

Scientific classification
- Kingdom: Plantae
- Clade: Tracheophytes
- Clade: Angiosperms
- Clade: Monocots
- Order: Asparagales
- Family: Asphodelaceae
- Subfamily: Asphodeloideae
- Genus: Aloe
- Species: A. vera

Binomial name
- Aloe vera (L.) Burm.f.

Synonyms
- Aloe barbadensis Mill.; Aloe barbadensis var. chinensis Haw.; Aloe chinensis (Haw.) Baker; Aloe elongata Murray; Aloe flava Pers.; Aloe indica Royle; Aloe lanzae Tod.; Aloe maculata Forssk. (illegitimate); Aloe perfoliata var. vera L.; Aloe rubescens DC.; Aloe variegata Forssk. (illegitimate); Aloe vera Mill. (illegitimate); Aloe vera var. chinensis (Haw.) A. Berger; Aloe vera var. lanzae Baker; Aloe vera var. littoralis J.Koenig ex Baker; Aloe vulgaris Lam.

= Aloe vera =

Species of plant

Aloe vera (/ˈæloʊ(i) ˈvɛrə, - ˈvɪər-/) is a succulent plant species of the genus Aloe. It is widely distributed and is considered an invasive species in many regions of the world.

An evergreen perennial, it originates from the Arabian Peninsula but also grows wild in other tropical, semi-tropical, and arid climates around the world. It is cultivated commercially and has been used for centuries as a topical treatment. The species is considered attractive for decorative purposes and is often used indoors as a potted plant.

The leaves of Aloe vera contain significant amounts of the polysaccharide gel acemannan, which may be used for topical purposes. The leaves also contain aloin, a toxic compound. Aloe vera products are typically made from the gel.

Aloe vera acemannan may be used in skin lotions, cosmetics, ointments, and gels for minor burns, skin abrasions, insect bites, and windburn.

Oral ingestion of aloe vera extracts may cause acute abdominal pain and cramps, and hepatitis if consumed chronically. It should not be used during pregnancy. Some people have allergic reactions to aloe when used on skin.

== Etymology ==
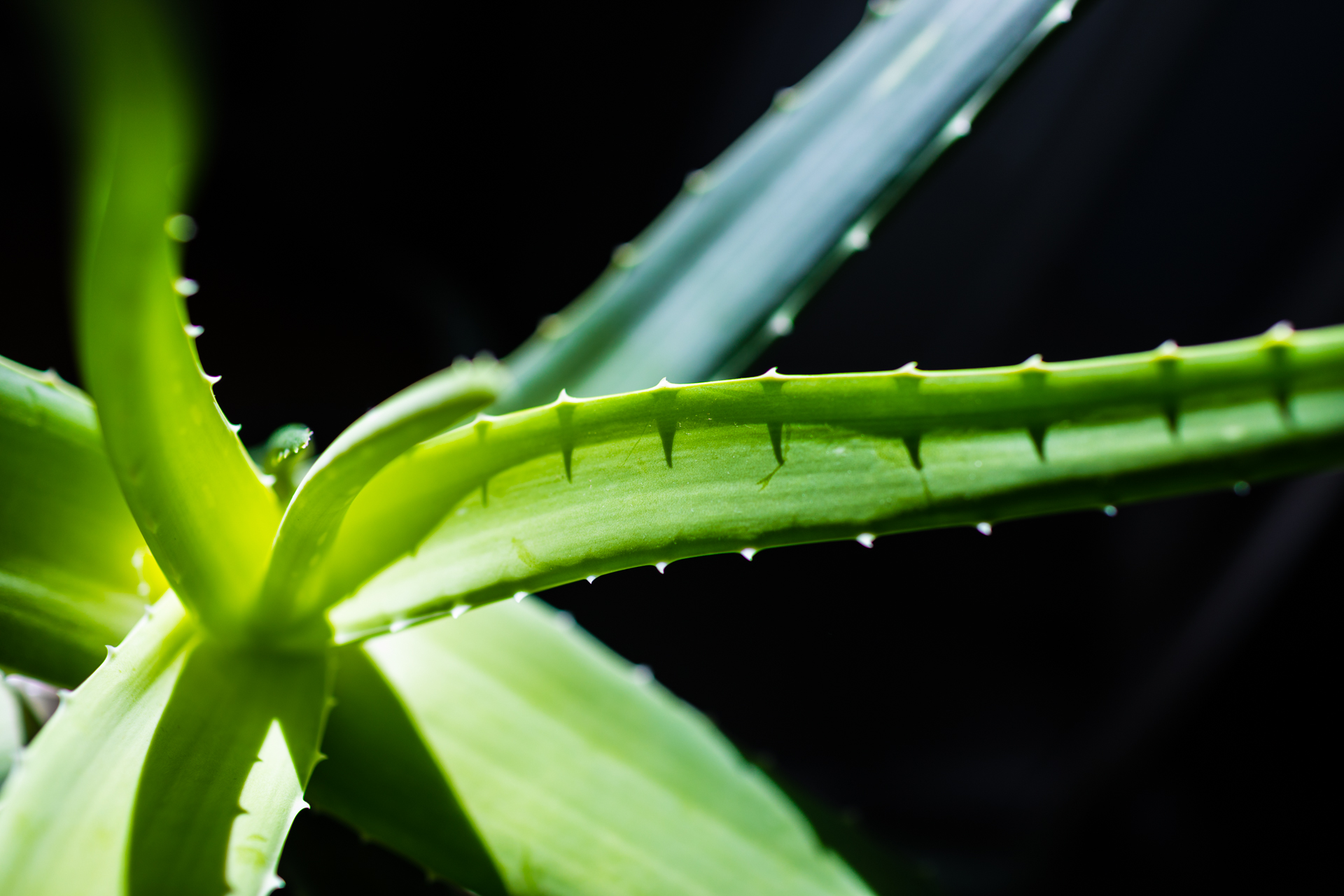
Teeth on the leaf edge

The genus name Aloe is derived from the Arabic word alloeh, meaning "bitter and shiny substance", or from Hebrew אוהלים ahalim, plural of אוהל ahal. The specific epithet vera comes from verus meaning "true" in Latin.

=== Common names ===
Common names use aloe with a region of its distribution, such as Chinese aloe, Cape aloe, or Barbados aloe.

=== Taxonomy ===
The species was first named Aloe perfoliata var. vera by Carl Linnaeus in 1753, based on previously published descriptions by Gaspard Bauhin (1623:386) and Hendrik van Rheede (1678). It was named as a separate species (as Aloe vera) on 6 April 1768 by Nicolaas Laurens Burman and by Philip Miller (as Aloe barbadensis) some ten days after Burman. Some literature identifies the white-spotted form of Aloe vera as Aloe vera var. chinensis, and the spotted form of Aloe vera may be conspecific with Aloe massawana.

Techniques based on DNA comparison suggest Aloe vera is closely related to Aloe perryi, a species endemic to Yemen. Similar techniques using chloroplast DNA sequence comparison and inter simple sequence repeat profiling have also suggested it is closely related to Aloe forbesii, Aloe inermis, Aloe scobinifolia, Aloe sinkatana, and Aloe striata. With the exception of the South African species A. striata, these Aloe species are native to Socotra (Yemen), Somalia, and Sudan. The lack of obvious natural populations of the species has led some authors to suggest Aloe vera may be of hybrid origin.

== Description ==
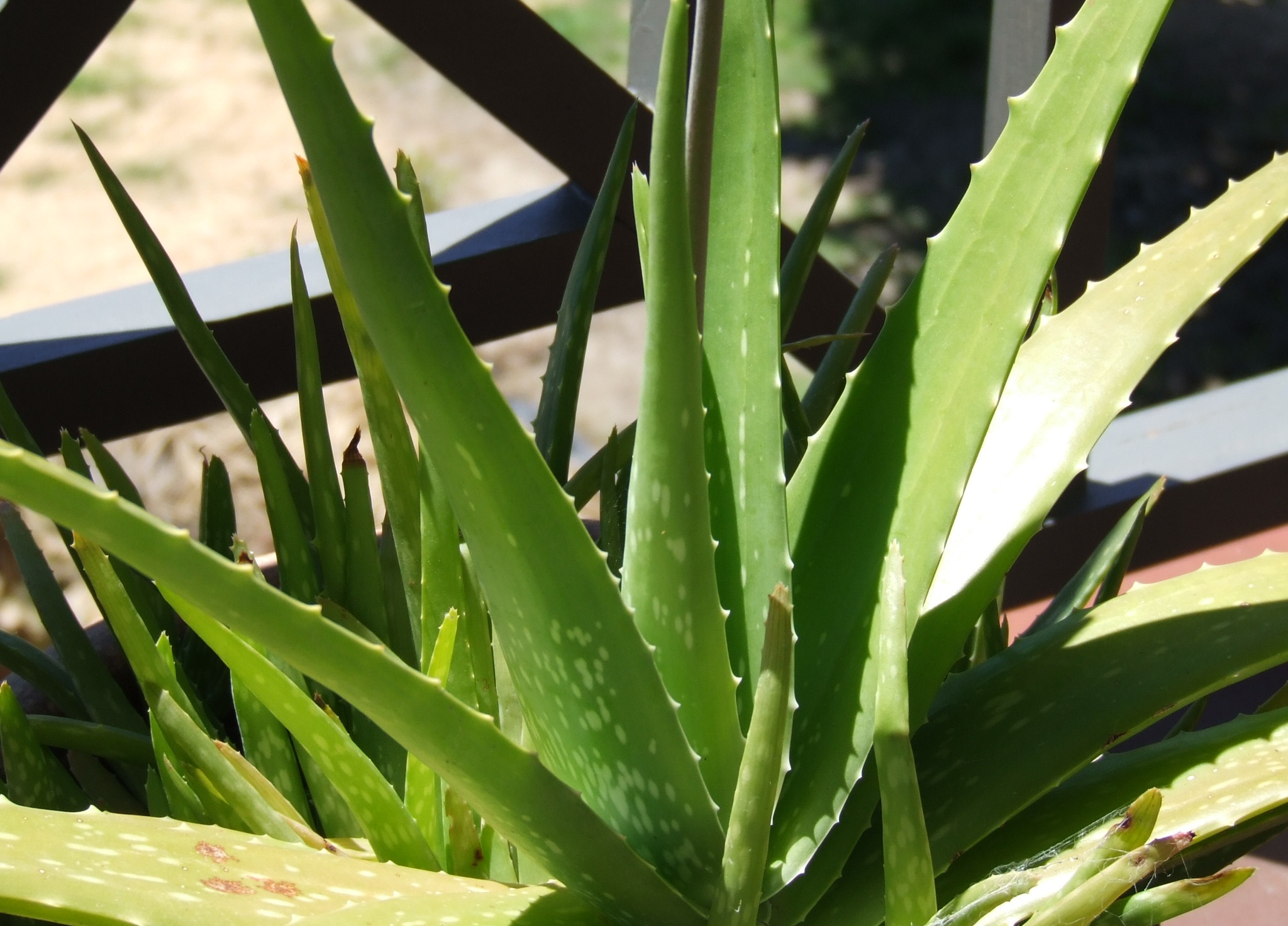
Spotted forms, also named Aloe vera var. chinensis

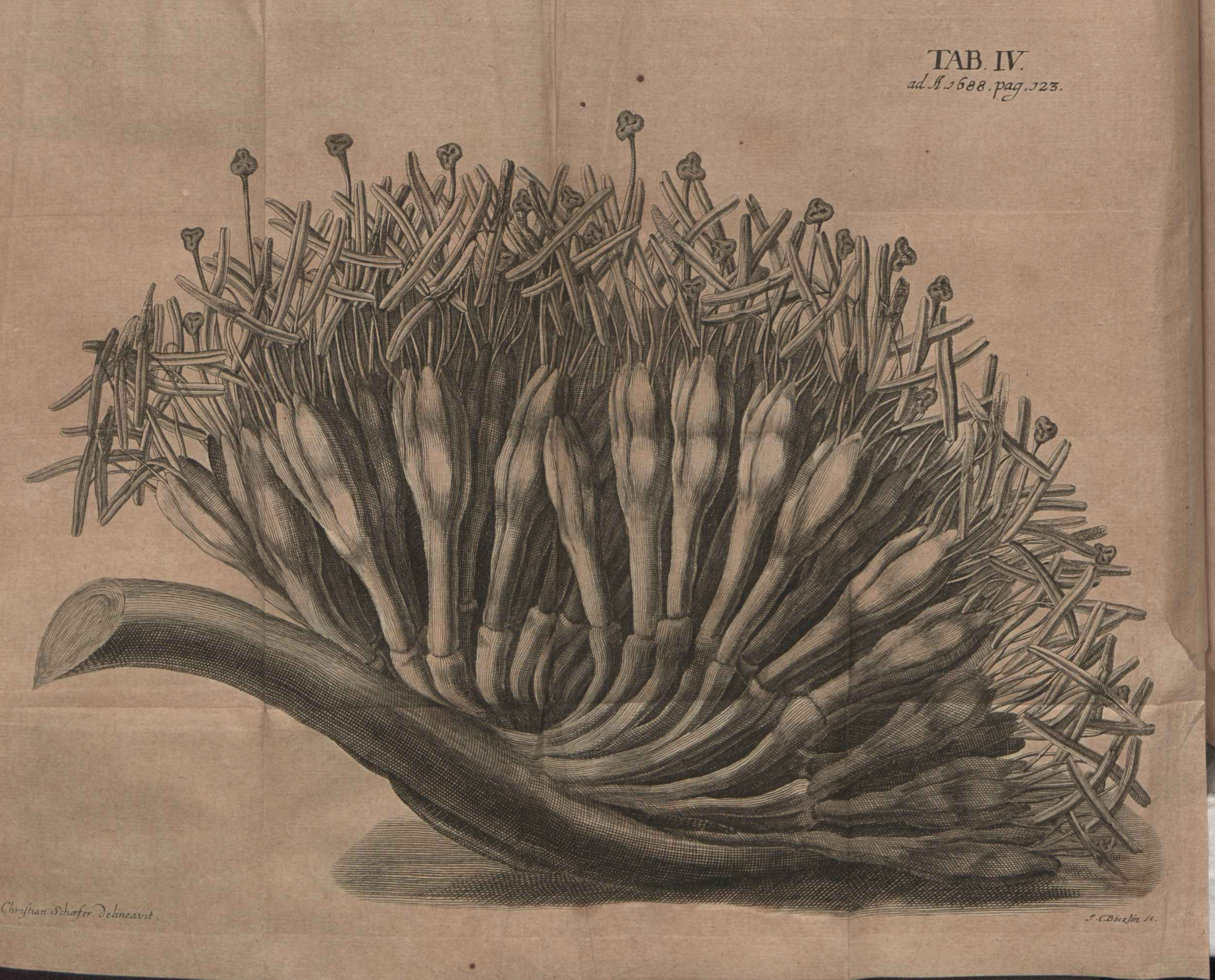
Historical image from Acta Eruditorum, 1688

Aloe vera is a stemless or very short-stemmed plant growing to 60–100 centimetres (24–39 inches) tall, spreading by offsets.

=== Leaves ===
The leaves are thick and fleshy, green to grey-green, with some varieties showing white flecks on their upper and lower stem surfaces. The margin of the leaf is serrated with small white teeth.

Aloe vera leaves contain phytochemicals, which are often studied for possible bioactivity. Some examples of phytochemicals include lignans, phytosterols, polyphenols, acetylated mannans, polymannans, anthraquinones C-glycosides, anthrones, and other anthraquinones such as emodin and various lectins.

=== Flowers ===
The aloe's flowers are produced in summer on a spike that grows up to 90 cm (35 in) tall. Each flower is pendulous with a yellow tubular corolla 2–3 cm (3/4–1 1/4 in) long.

=== Roots ===
Like other Aloe species, Aloe vera forms arbuscular mycorrhiza, a root symbiosis that allows the plant better access to mineral nutrients in the soil.

== Distribution ==
Aloe vera is considered to be native to the southeastern region of the Arabian Peninsula in the Hajar Mountains in northeastern Oman and eastern U.A.E. However, since being widely cultivated around the world, the plant has become naturalized in North Africa as well as in Sudan and its neighboring countries, in the Canary Islands, Cape Verde, and the Madeira Islands. It is also naturalized in the Algarve region of Portugal and in wild areas across Spain, especially in the region of Murcia.

The species was introduced to China and parts of southern Europe in the 17th century. The current distribution, including in arid, temperate, and tropical regions of temperate continents, may be the result of cultivation.

== Cultivation ==
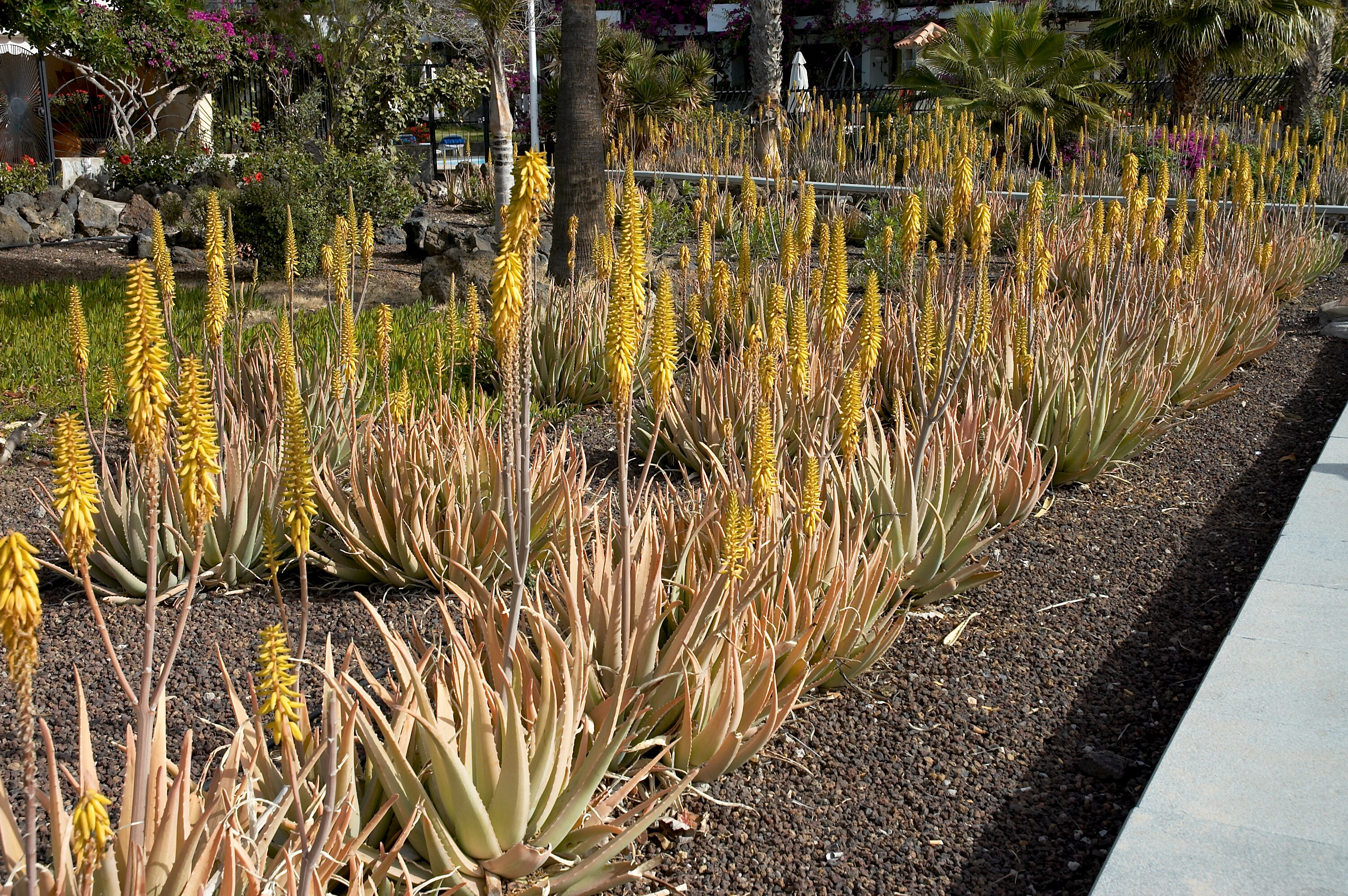
As an ornamental plant

Aloe vera has been widely grown as an ornamental plant, popular with modern gardeners as a topical medicinal plant and for its interesting flowers, form, and succulence. This succulence enables the species to survive in areas of low natural rainfall, making it ideal for rockeries and other low water-use gardens. It is hardy in zones 8–11 and is intolerant of heavy frost and snow. The species is relatively resistant to most insect pests, though spider mites, mealy bugs, scale insects, and aphid species may cause a decline in plant health. This plant has earned the Royal Horticultural Society's Award of Garden Merit.

In pots the species requires well drained, sandy potting soil and bright, sunny conditions. Aloe plants can turn red from sunburn under too much direct sun, though gradual acclimation may help. The use of a good-quality commercial propagation soil mix or packaged "cacti and succulent mix" is recommended, as they allow for good drainage. Terra cotta pots are preferable for being porous. Potted plants should be allowed to dry completely before watering. When potted, aloes can become crowded with "pups" growing from the sides of the "mother plant". Overcrowded plants can be divided and repotted to allow room for further growth, or the pups can be left with the mother plant. During winter Aloe vera may become dormant, during which little moisture is required. In areas with frost or snow the species is best kept indoors or in heated glasshouses.

There is large-scale agricultural production of Aloe vera in Australia, Cuba, the Dominican Republic, China, Mexico, India, Jamaica, Kenya, Tanzania, South Africa, Spain, and the United States, with much of the output going toward the cosmetics industry.

== Uses ==
Two substances from Aloe vera – a clear gel and its yellow latex – are used to manufacture commercial products. Aloe gel is typically used to make topical medications for skin conditions such as burns, wounds, frostbite, rashes, psoriasis, cold sores, and dry skin. Aloe latex is used individually or mixed with other ingredients to be ingested for relief from constipation. Aloe latex may be obtained in a dried form called resin or as "aloe dried juice".

There is conflicting evidence over whether Aloe vera is effective in treating wounds or burns. Topical use of aloe products may relieve symptoms of certain skin disorders like psoriasis, acne, or rashes, but it may also cause an allergic reaction in some people.

Aloe vera gel is used commercially as an ingredient in yogurts, beverages, and some desserts, but ingesting aloe latex or whole leaf extract at high or prolonged doses can be toxic. Use of topical aloe vera in small amounts is likely to be safe.

=== Topical medication and potential side effects ===
Aloe vera may be prepared as a lotion, gel, soap, or cosmetics product for use on skin as a topical medication. The gel has an acid pH of 4.4 to 4.7, possibly causing a burning sensation or rash when applied to skin.

For people with allergies to Aloe vera, skin reactions may include contact dermatitis with mild redness and itching, difficulty with breathing, or swelling of the face, lips, tongue, or throat.

=== Dietary supplement ===
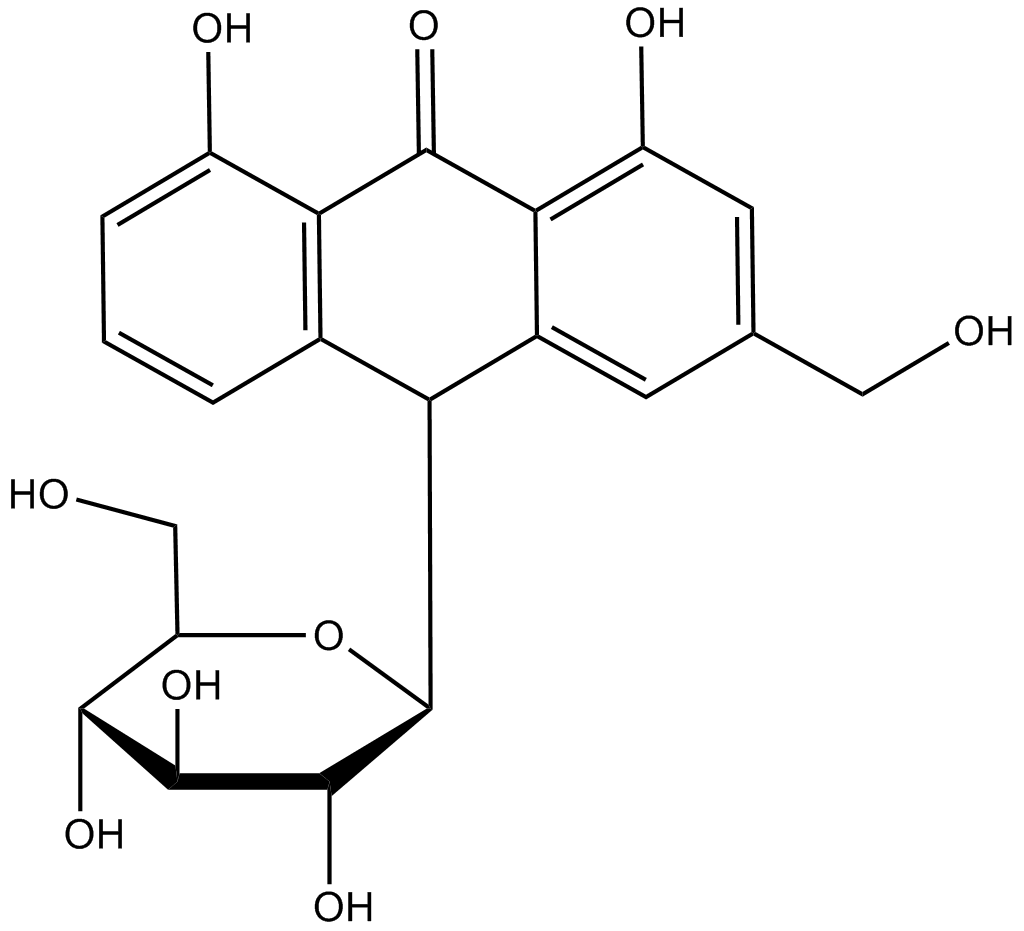
Aloin

Aloin, a bitter-tasting compound found in the semi-liquid latex of some Aloe species, was a common ingredient in over-the-counter (OTC) laxative products in the United States until 2002. The Food and Drug Administration banned it when manufacturers failed to provide the necessary safety data.

Aloe vera and its (alcohol) extracts have potential toxicity, with side effects occurring at certain dose levels when ingested or applied topically. Although toxicity may decrease when aloin is removed through processing, ingesting Aloe vera in high amounts may induce side effects such as abdominal pain, diarrhea, or hepatitis. Chronic ingestion of aloe (at a rate of 1 gram per day) causes adverse effects including hematuria, weight loss, and cardiac or kidney disorders.

Aloe vera juice is marketed to support the health of the digestive system, but there is neither scientific evidence nor regulatory approval for this claim. The extracts and quantities typically used for such purposes are associated with toxicity in a dose-dependent way.

=== Traditional medicine ===
Aloe vera is used in traditional medicine as a skin treatment. Early records of its use appear from the fourth millennium BCE. It is also written of in the Juliana Anicia Codex of 512 CE. A beverage or ointment using aloe flesh may have been used for various illnesses in Caribbean regions during the 20th century.

=== Commodities ===
Aloe vera is used on facial tissues where it is promoted as a moisturizer and anti-irritant to reduce chafing of the nose. Cosmetic companies commonly add sap or other derivatives from Aloe vera to products such as makeup, tissues, moisturizers, soaps, sunscreens, incense, shaving cream, or shampoos. A review of academic literature notes that its inclusion in many hygiene products is due to its "moisturizing emollient effect". The cosmetic industry limits the anthraquinone content of aloe extracts to 50 ppm.

== Toxicity ==
Orally ingested non-decolorized aloe vera leaf extract was listed by the California Office of Environmental Health Hazard Assessment among "chemicals known to the state to cause cancer or reproductive toxicity", possibly resulting from the anthraquinones.

Since 2016 aloe vera whole leaf extract is classified as a possible human carcinogen (group 2B) by the International Agency for Research on Cancer.

Use of aloe vera on the skin is generally not associated with significant side effects. Oral ingestion of aloe vera is potentially toxic, and may cause abdominal cramps and diarrhea, which in turn can decrease the absorption of drugs.

=== Interactions with prescribed drugs ===
Ingested aloe products may have adverse interactions with prescription drugs, such as those used to treat blood clots, diabetes, heart disease and potassium-lowering agents (such as digoxin), and diuretics, among others.

== Gallery ==
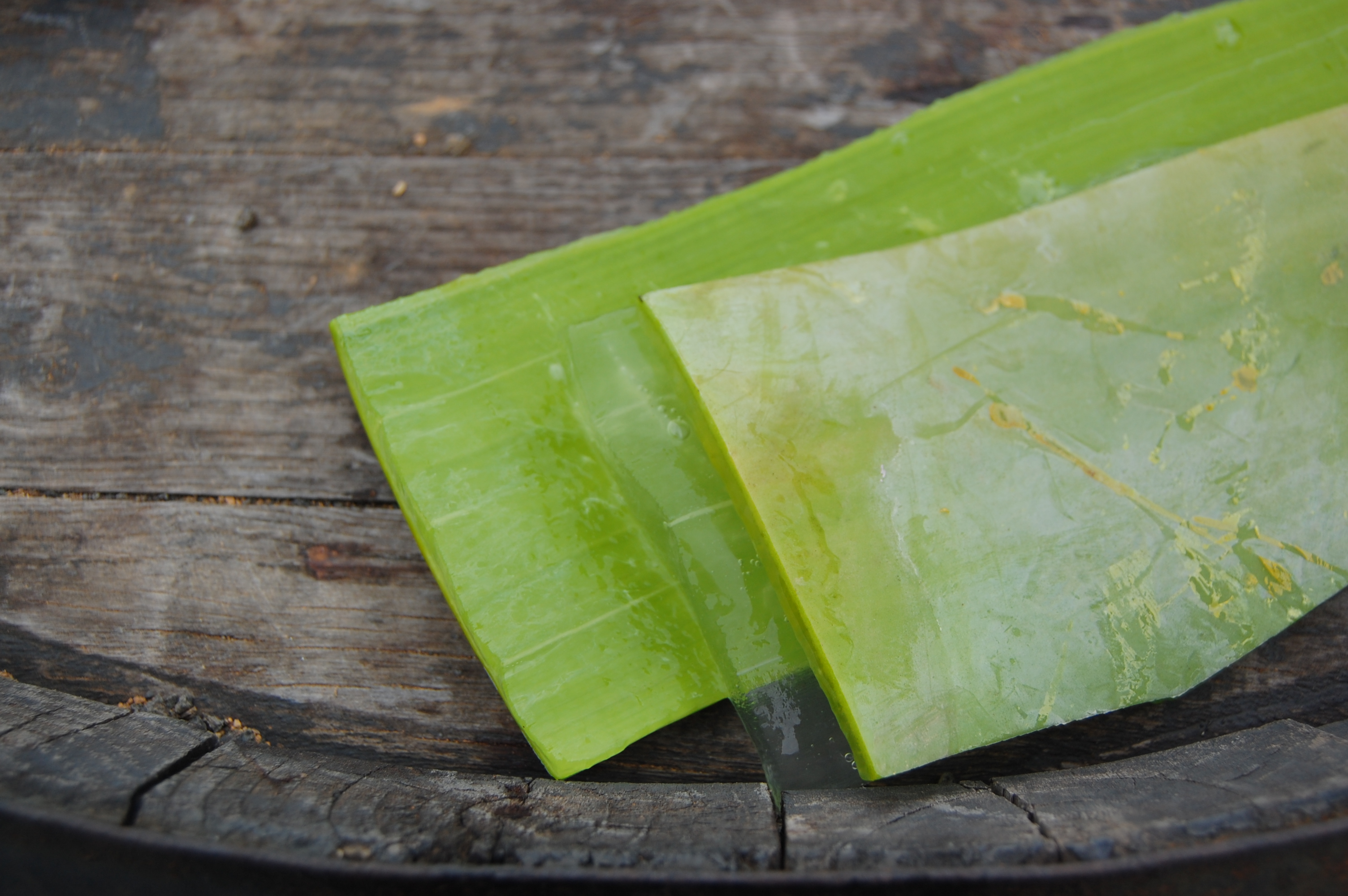
Leaf and inner gel

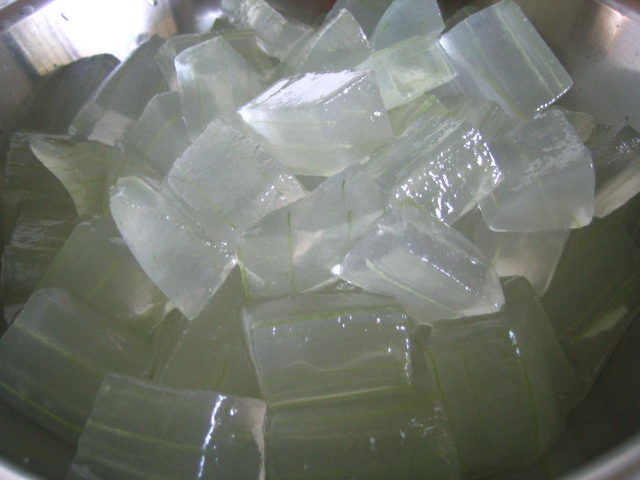
Gel used for desserts

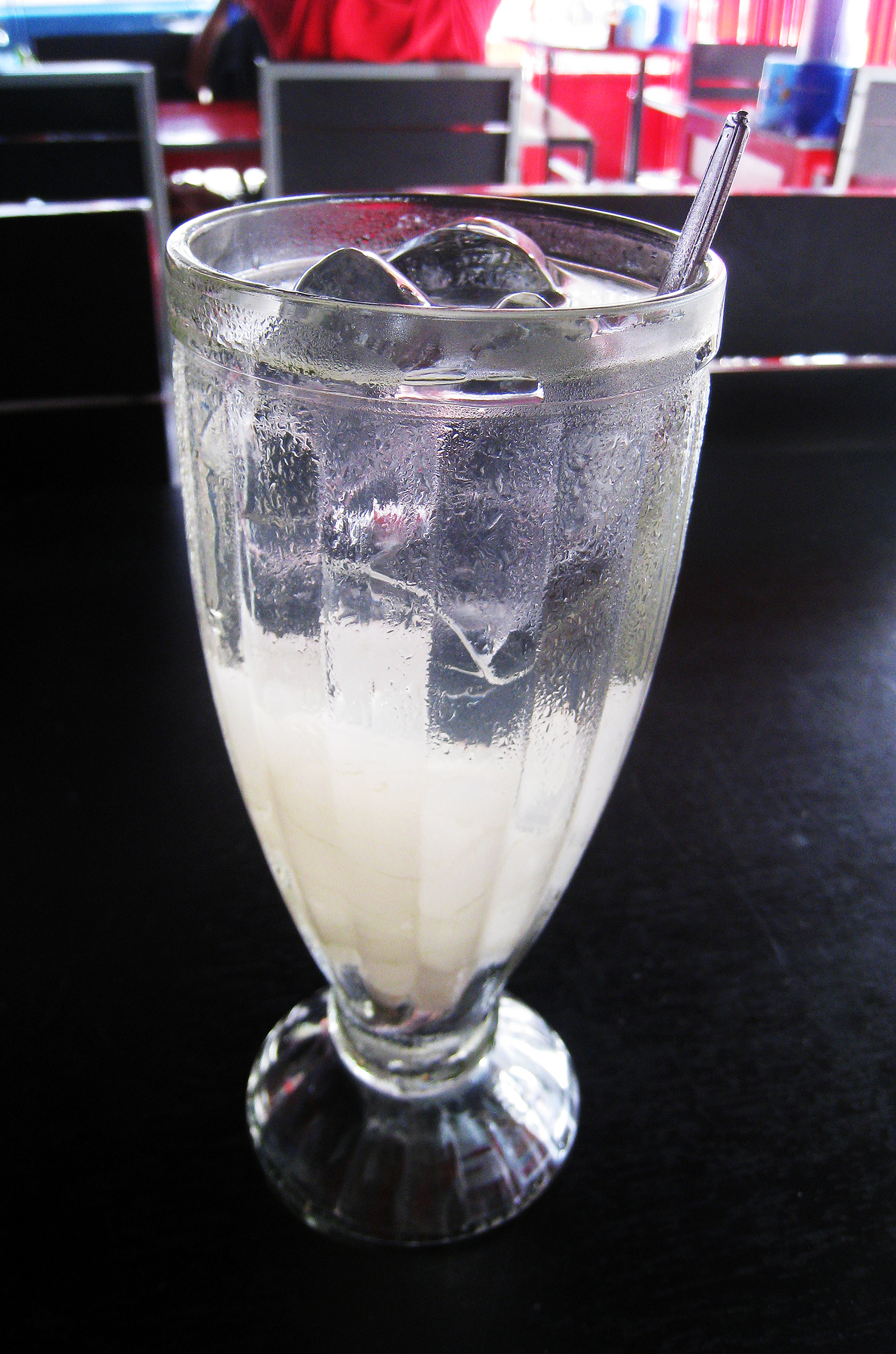
Es lidah buaya, an Indonesian Aloe vera iced drink

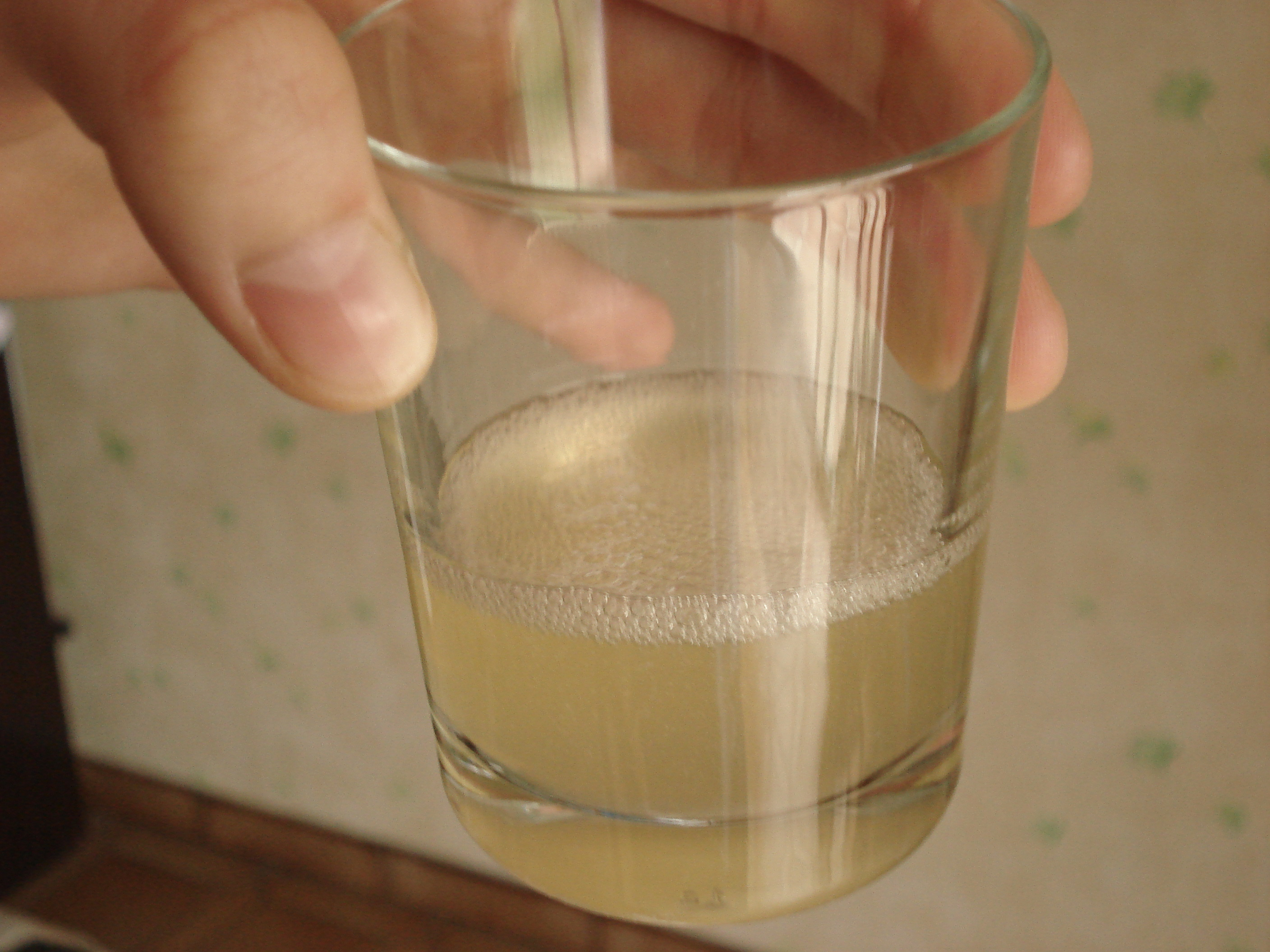
Juice

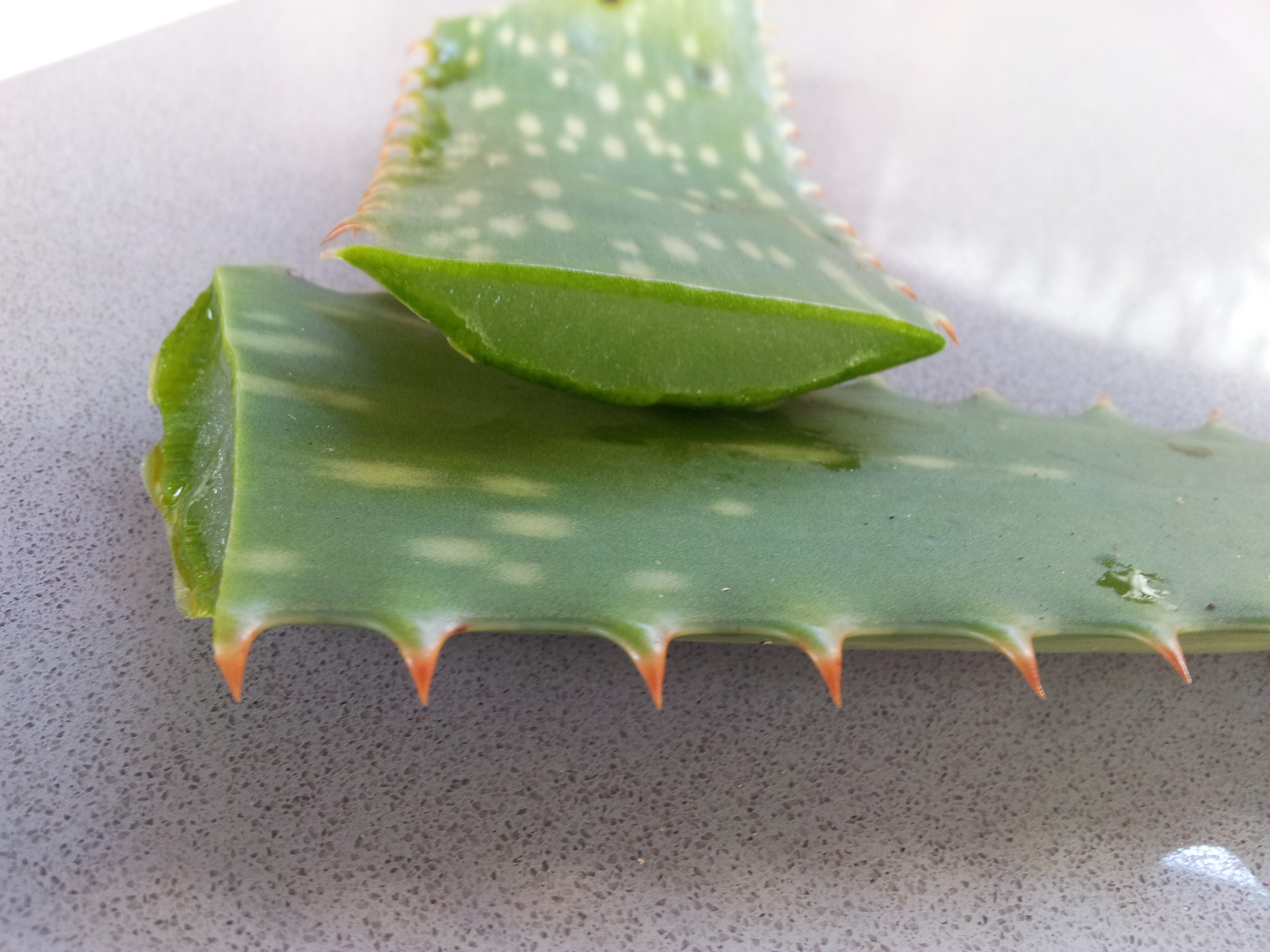
Cut leaf

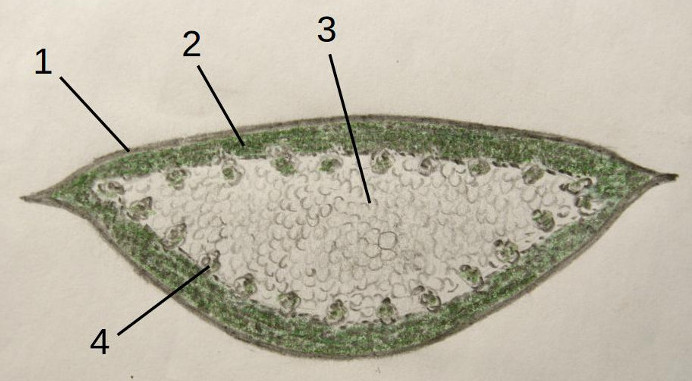
Diagram of leaf: 1 Cuticle, 2 Chloroplast parenchym, 3 Inner tissue, 4 Vascular bundles

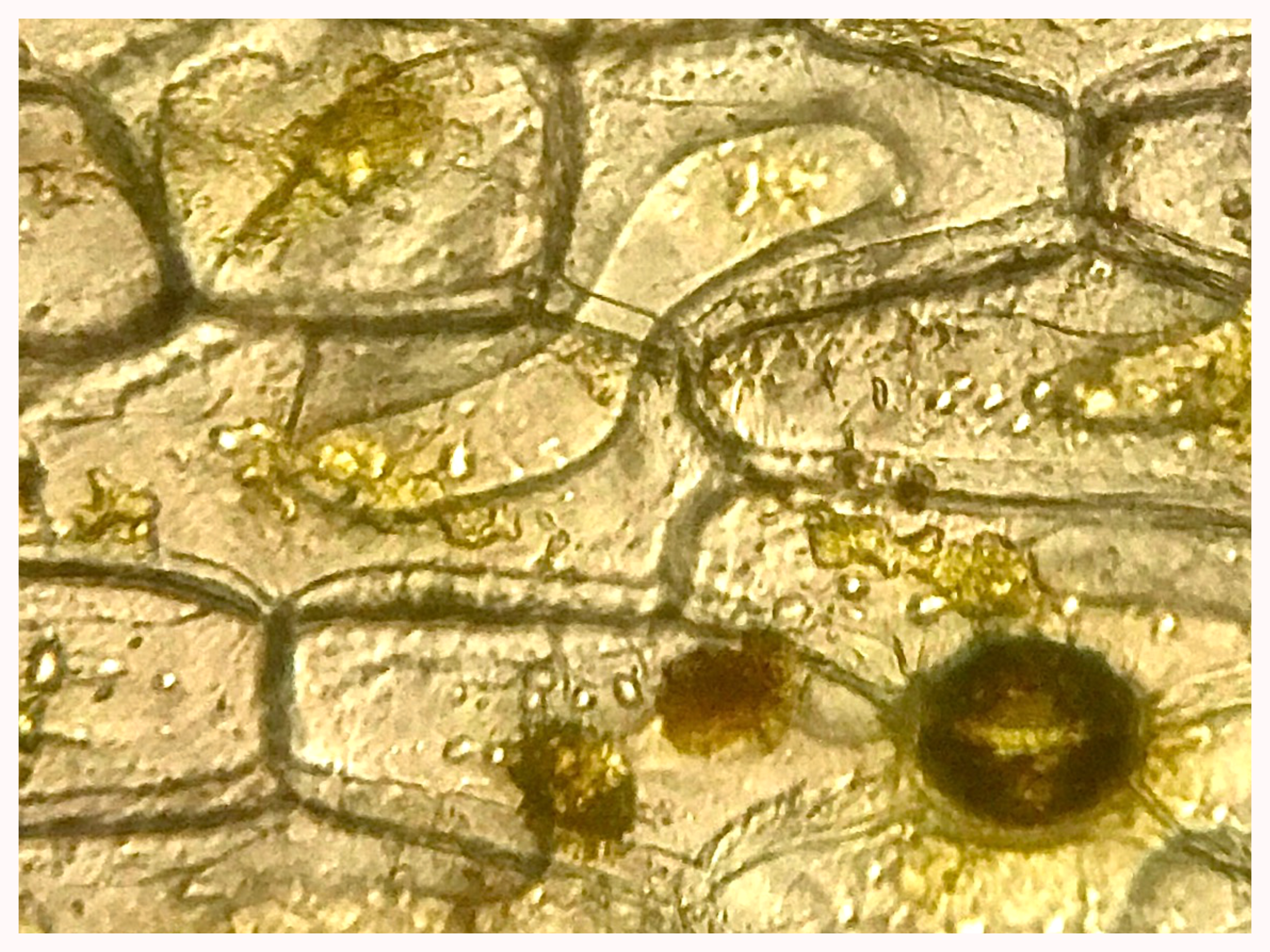
Photomicrograph of cytoplasms stained yellow, nuclei in brighter yellow, and brown cell walls

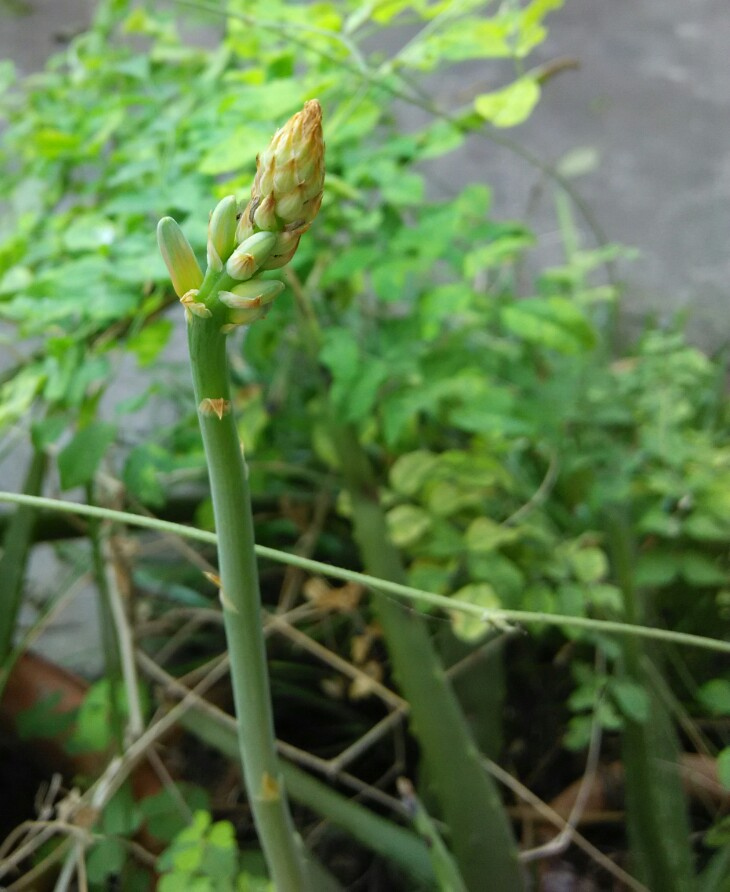
Buds

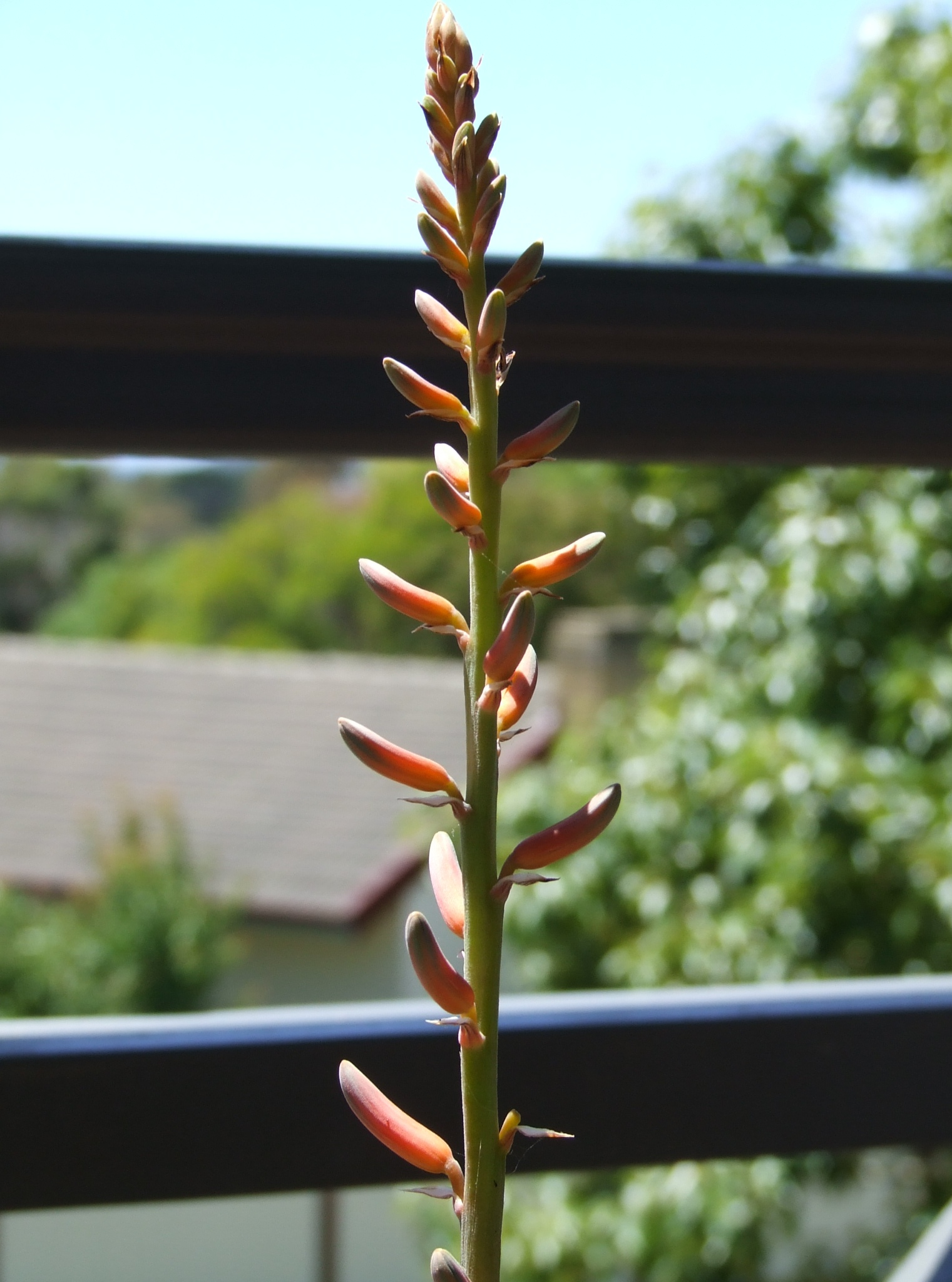
Flower buds

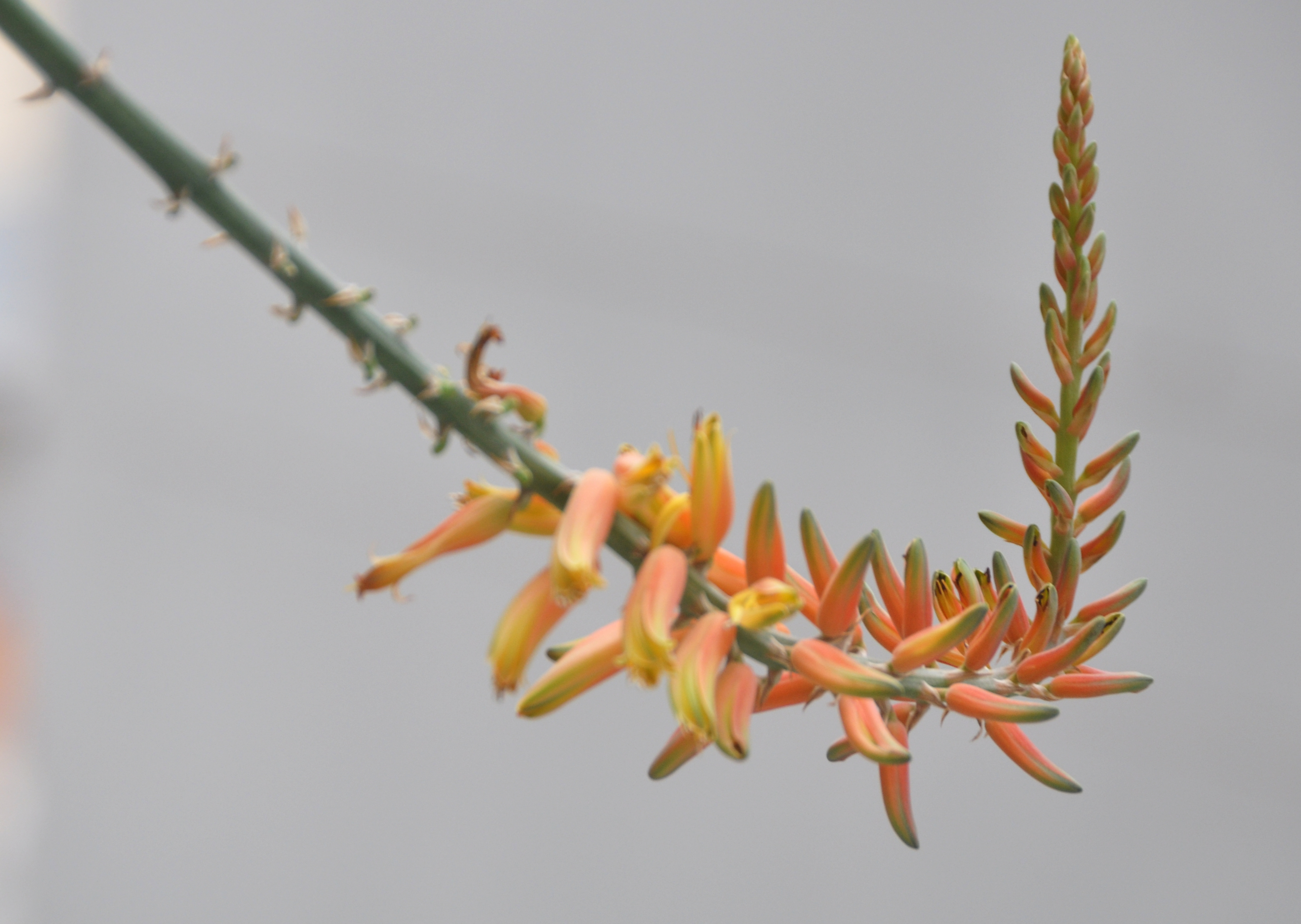
Flowers
