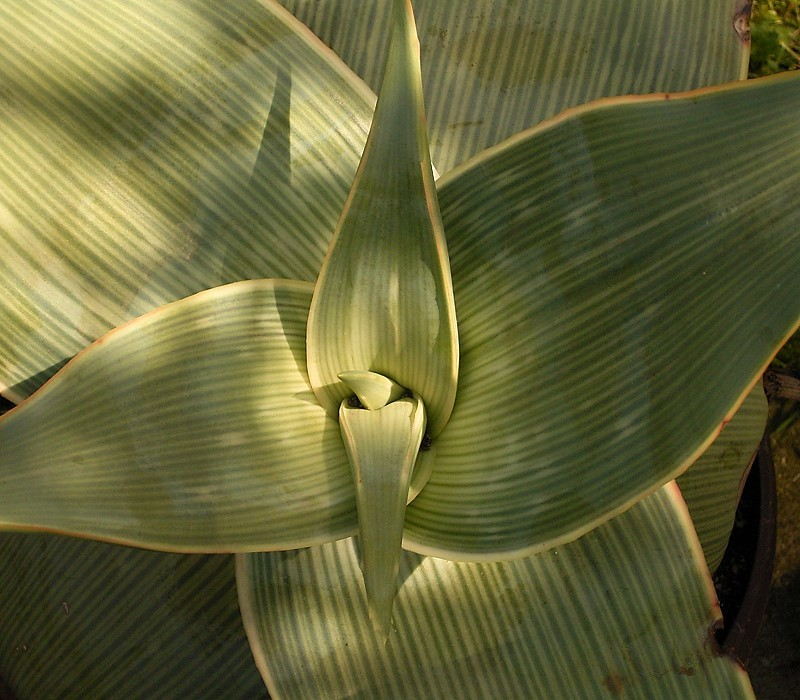

Scientific classification
- Kingdom: Plantae
- Clade: Tracheophytes
- Clade: Angiosperms
- Clade: Monocots
- Order: Asparagales
- Family: Asphodelaceae
- Subfamily: Asphodeloideae
- Genus: Aloe
- Species: A. karasbergensis

Binomial name
- Aloe karasbergensis Pillans

= Aloe karasbergensis =

Species of flowering plant

Aloe karasbergensis is a species of Aloe found in Namibia to the Northwest Cape Province, South Africa.

== Description ==
A large aloe usually solitary though they may rarely clump when mature. Has green leaves with black stripes. with a white hard leaf margin which is sometimes pink. This is the main distinguishing feature on this plant. This plant is similar to Aloe striata except for the fact that it has striped leaves.

== Flowers ==
Flowers of this aloe are similar to Aloe striata in that the flowers are pink and tubular with multiple branches on the inflorescence.

== Gallery ==
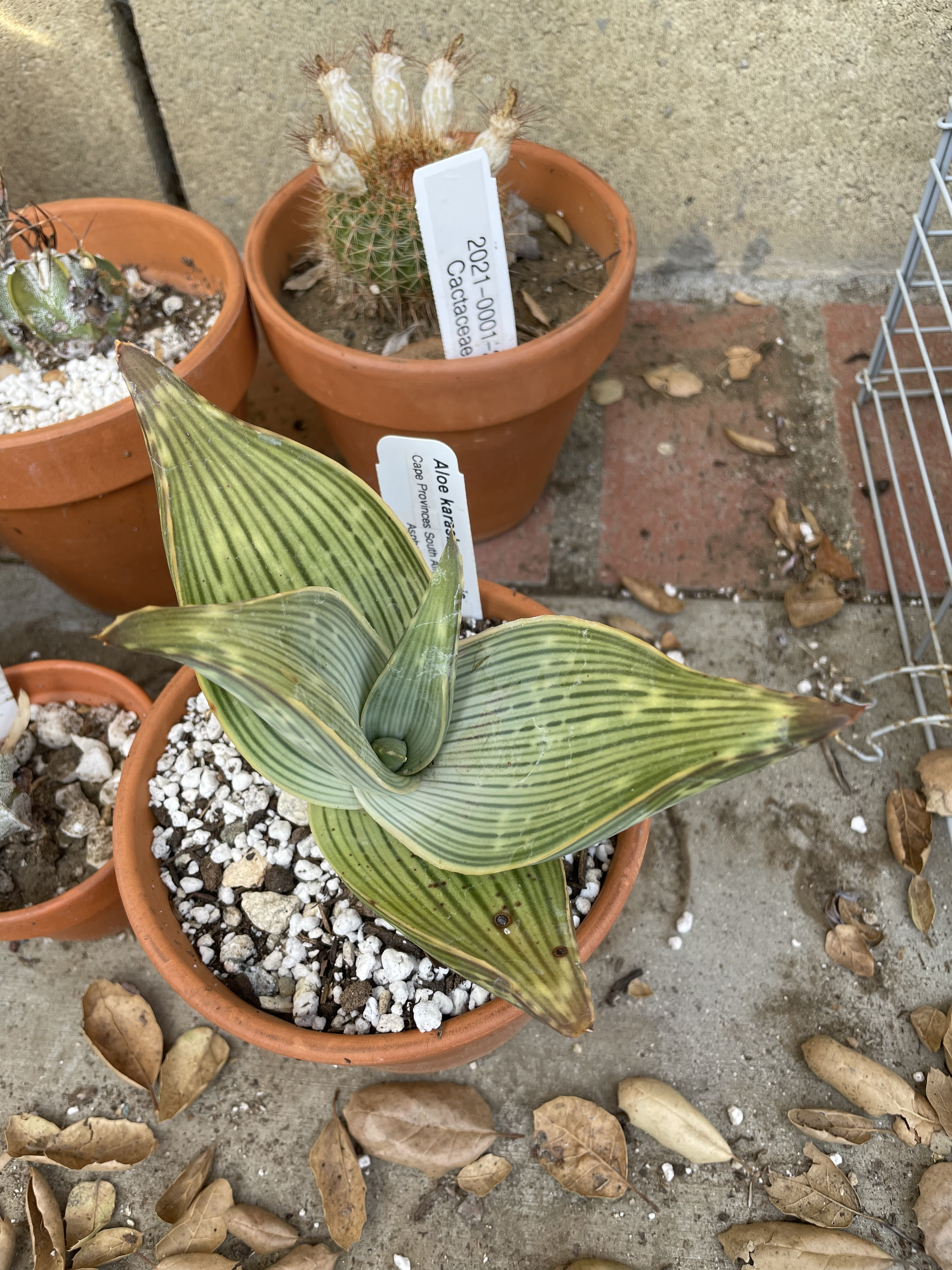
Young Aloe karasbergensis, 2023-0010-3 grown outdoors in Agoura Hills, California

== Subspecies ==
- Aloe karasbergensis subsp. karasbergensis
- Aloe karasbergensis subsp. hunsbergensis
