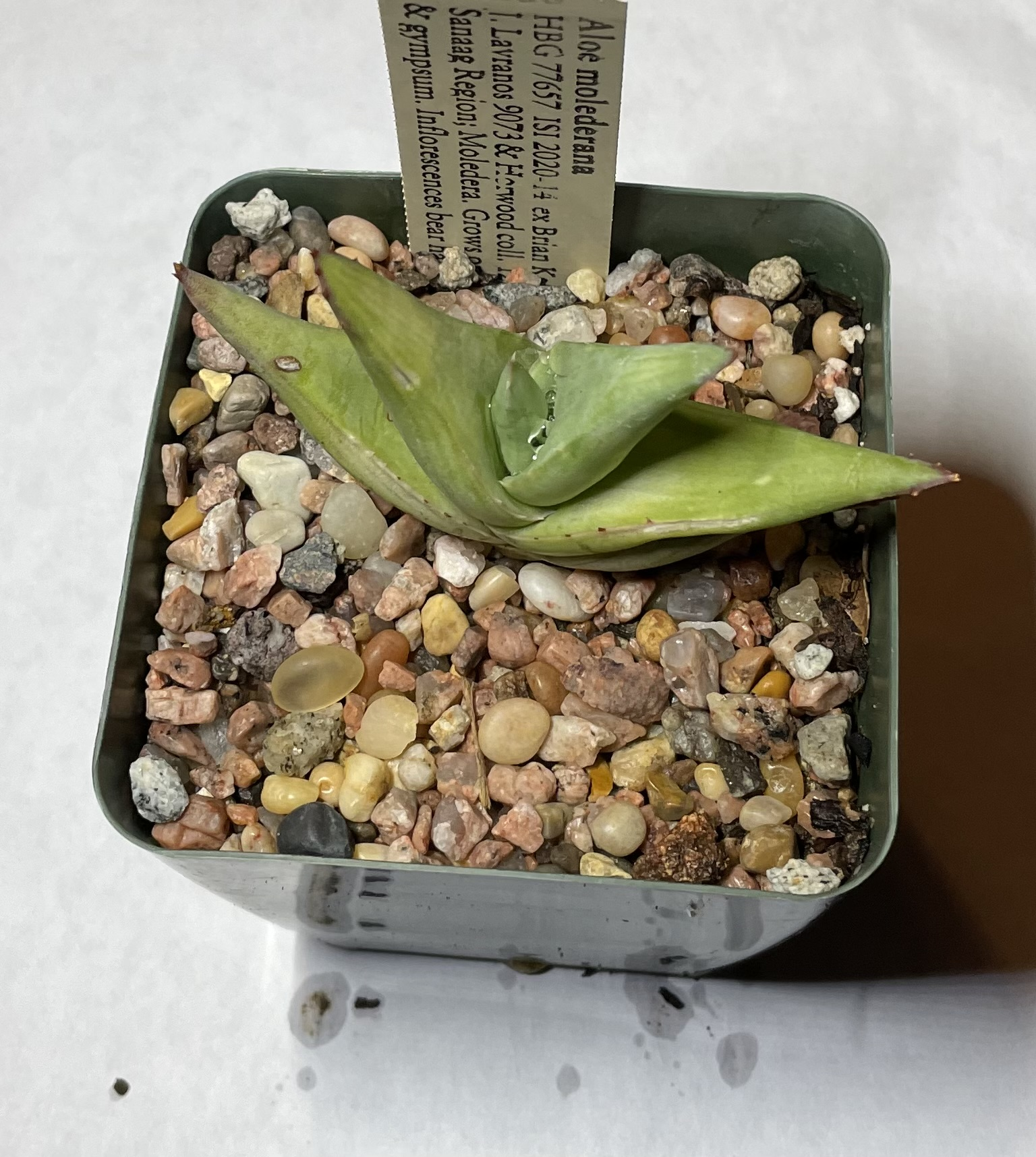

Conservation status
- Critically Endangered (IUCN 3.1)
- CITES Appendix II (CITES)

Scientific classification
- Kingdom: Plantae
- Clade: Tracheophytes
- Clade: Angiosperms
- Clade: Monocots
- Order: Asparagales
- Family: Asphodelaceae
- Subfamily: Asphodeloideae
- Genus: Aloe
- Species: A. molederana

Binomial name
- Aloe molederana Lavranos & Glen

= Aloe molederana =

Species of Aloe

Aloe molederana is a criticially endangered species of aloe native to northern Somalia. It was first described in 1989 by John Jacob Lavranos and H.F. Glen.

== Flowers ==
Its flowers are fuzzy like Aloe tomentosa and are a pink-orange color. The flowers are tubular like all other aloe species. The inflorescences branch and the racemes are short.

== Description ==
Aloe molederana is a plant that grows in limestone and gypsum. It is similar in look to many aloes, such as Aloe vera. It is a large aloe rosette.
