= Acemannan =

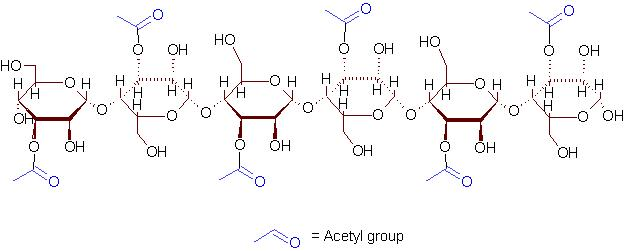
- A representative 6-sugar fragment of acemannan

Names
- IUPAC name (2S,3S,4R,5S,6S)-6-[(2R,3R,4R,5S,6R)-6-[(2R,3S,4R,5S,6R)-5-acetamido-6-[(2R,3R,4R,5S,6R)-4-acetyloxy-6-[(2R,3R,4R,5S,6R)-4-acetyloxy-6-[(2R,3R,4R,5S,6S)-4-acetyloxy-5-hydroxy-2-(hydroxymethyl)-6-methoxyoxan-3-yl]oxy-5-hydroxy-2-(hydroxymethyl)oxan-3-yl]oxy-5-hydroxy-2-(hydroxymethyl)oxan-3-yl]oxy-4-hydroxy-2-(hydroxymethyl)oxan-3-yl]oxy-4-acetyloxy-5-hydroxy-2-(hydroxymethyl)oxan-3-yl]oxy-4-acetyloxy-3-[(2R,3S,4R,5R,6R)-4-acetyloxy-5-[(2R,3S,4R,5R,6R)-4-acetyloxy-3-hydroxy-6-(hydroxymethyl)-5-methoxyoxan-2-yl]oxy-3-hydroxy-6-(hydroxymethyl)oxan-2-yl]oxy-5-hydroxyoxane-2-carboxylate

Identifiers
CAS Number	110042-95-0
3D model (JSmol)	Interactive image
ChemSpider	65033
ECHA InfoCard	100.122.396
EC Number	600-942-8
PubChem CID	72041
UNII	UZ29E6L2X8
CompTox Dashboard (EPA)	DTXSID00149125
- InChI: InChI=1S/C66H101NO49/c1-18(75)67-33-34(83)42(26(11-68)102-59(33)110-44-29(14-71)106-63(38(87)51(44)97-21(4)78)113-46-30(15-72)107-64(39(88)53(46)99-23(6)80)111-45-28(13-70)103-60(94-10)35(84)50(45)96-20(3)77)109-61-37(86)52(98-22(5)79)48(32(17-74)105-61)114-66-41(90)55(101-25(8)82)56(57(116-66)58(91)92)115-65-40(89)54(100-24(7)81)47(31(16-73)108-65)112-62-36(85)49(95-19(2)76)43(93-9)27(12-69)104-62/h26-57,59-66,68-74,83-90H,11-17H2,1-10H3,(H,67,75)(H,91,92)/p-1/t26-,27-,28-,29-,30-,31-,32-,33+,34-,35+,36+,37+,38+,39+,40+,41+,42-,43-,44-,45-,46-,47-,48-,49-,50-,51-,52-,53-,54-,55-,56+,57+,59-,60+,61-,62-,63-,64-,65-,66+/m1/s1 Key: XOYXESIZZFUVRD-UVSAJTFZSA-M
- SMILES: CC(=O)N[C@H]1[C@H]([C@@H]([C@H](O[C@@H]1O[C@@H]2[C@H](O[C@@H]([C@H]([C@H]2OC(=O)C)O)O[C@@H]3[C@H](O[C@@H]([C@H]([C@H]3OC(=O)C)O)O[C@@H]4[C@H](O[C@@H]([C@H]([C@H]4OC(=O)C)O)OC)CO)CO)CO)CO)O[C@@H]5[C@H]([C@H]([C@@H]([C@H](O5)CO)O[C@@H]6[C@H]([C@H]([C@@H]([C@H](O6)C(=O)[O-])O[C@@H]7[C@H]([C@H]([C@@H]([C@H](O7)CO)O[C@@H]8[C@H]([C@H]([C@@H]([C@H](O8)CO)OC)OC(=O)C)O)OC(=O)C)O)OC(=O)C)O)OC(=O)C)O)O

Properties
Chemical formula	C_{66}H_{100}NO_{49}
Molar mass	1691.484 g·mol^{−1}
- Except where otherwise noted, data are given for materials in their standard state (at 25 °C [77 °F], 100 kPa). Infobox references

Acemannan is a D-isomer mucopolysaccharide in aloe vera leaves. This compound has potential immunostimulant, antiviral, antineoplastic, and gastrointestinal properties.

== Chemical structure and properties ==
Acemannan's monomer is mannoacetate linked by β-1,4-glycosidic bonds. This polymer is hydrophilic.

== Immunostimulant properties ==
Acemannan has been demonstrated to induce macrophages to secrete interferon (IFN), tumor necrosis factor-α (TNF-α) and interleukins (IL-1); therefore, it might help to prevent or abrogate viral infection. These three cytokines are known to cause inflammation, and interferon is released in response to viral infections. In vitro studies have shown acemannan to inhibit HIV replication; however, in vivo studies have been inconclusive.

Acemannan is currently being used for treatment and clinical management of fibrosarcoma in dogs and cats. Administration of acemannan has been shown to increase tumor necrosis and prolonged host survival; the animals have demonstrated lymphoid infiltration and encapsulation.

The compound has been found to have an LD_{50} of >80 mg/kg and LC_{50} >5,000 mg/kg IV.
