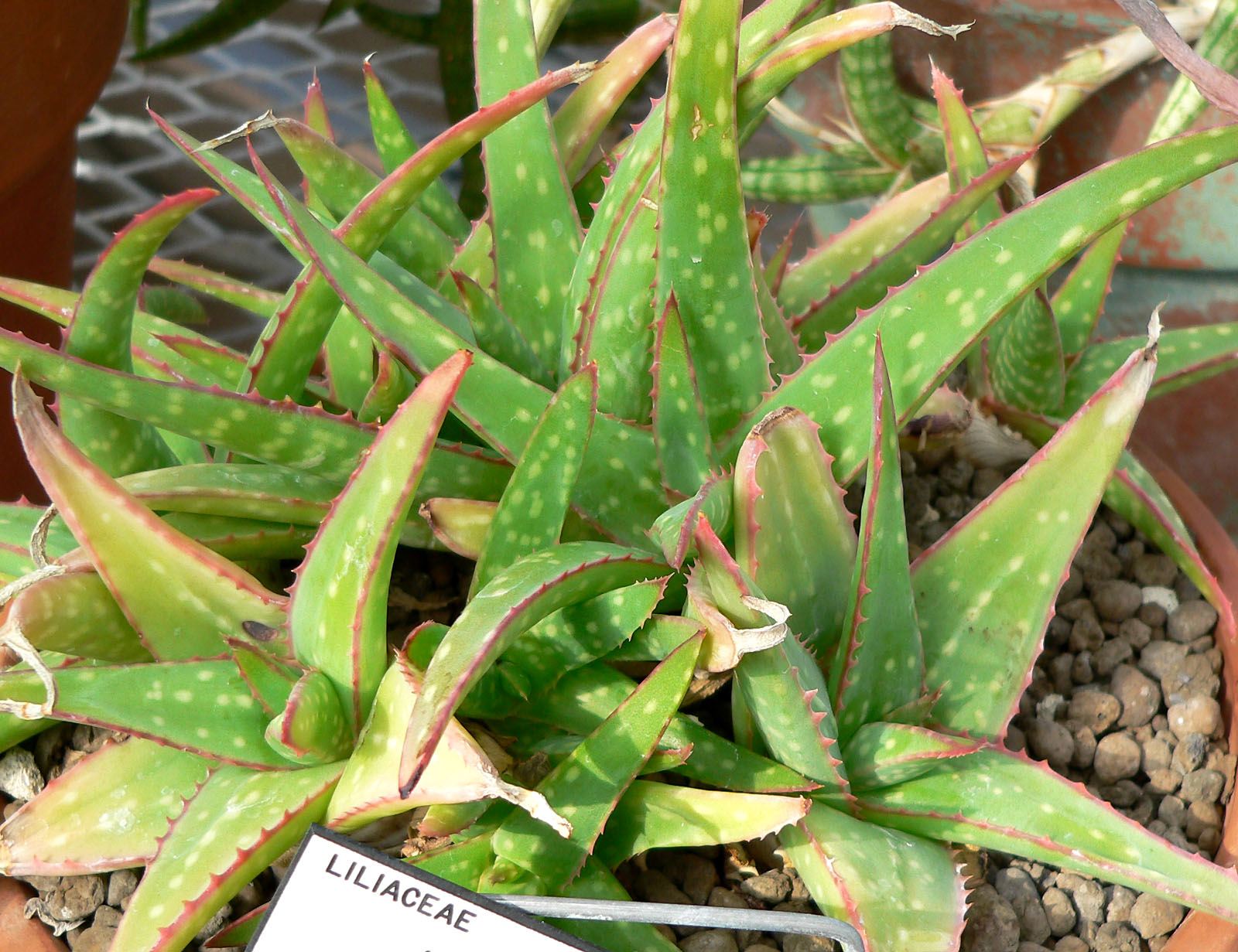

Conservation status
- Endangered (IUCN 3.1)
- CITES Appendix II (CITES)

Scientific classification
- Kingdom: Plantae
- Clade: Tracheophytes
- Clade: Angiosperms
- Clade: Monocots
- Order: Asparagales
- Family: Asphodelaceae
- Subfamily: Asphodeloideae
- Genus: Aloe
- Species: A. sinkatana

Binomial name
- Aloe sinkatana Reynolds

= Aloe sinkatana =

Species of succulent

Aloe sinkatana is a small, stemless Aloe native to Sudan. The plant is sometimes confused for the more common, medicinal Aloe vera.

== See also ==
- Succulent plant
