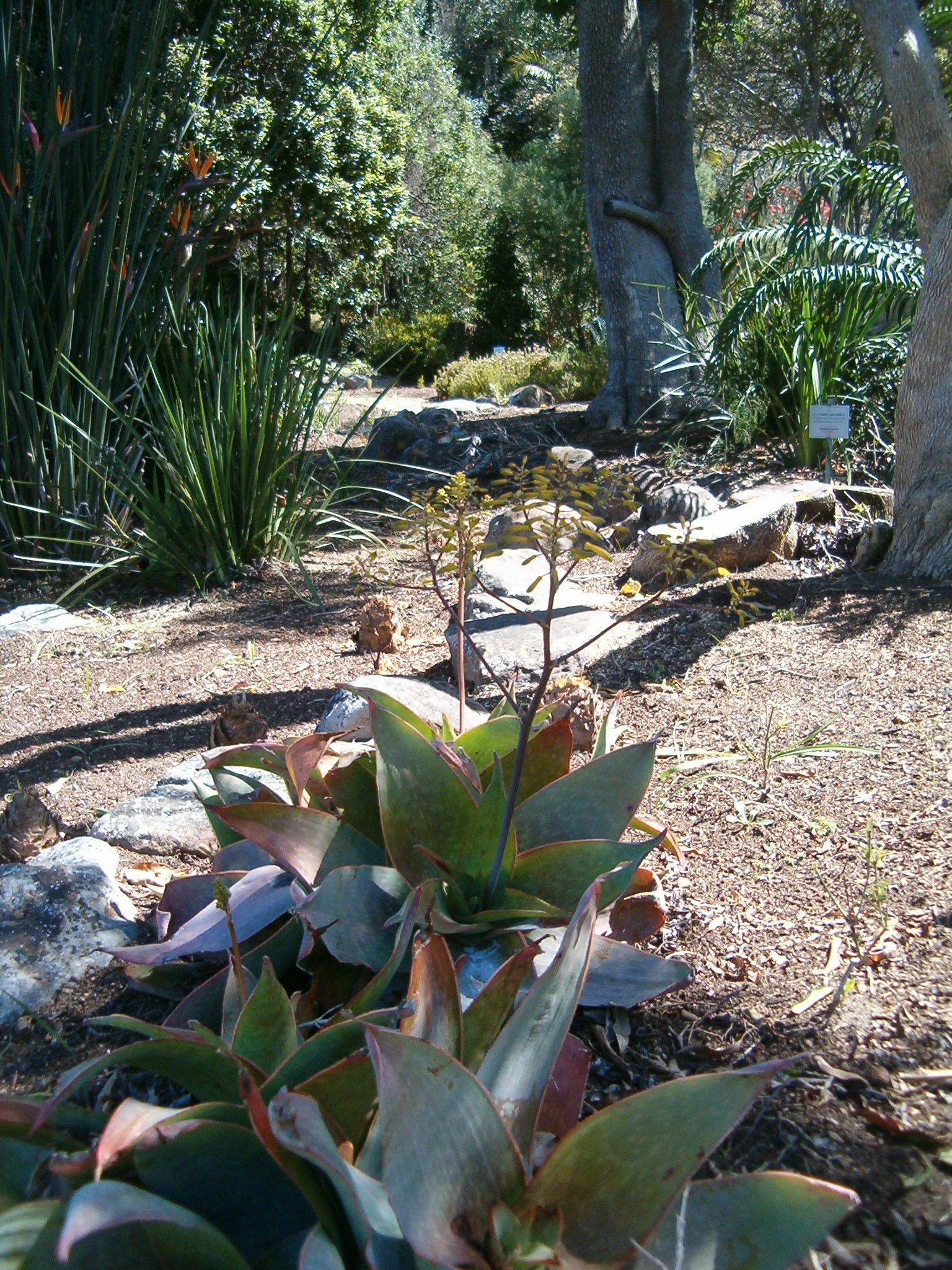
- Aloe reynoldsii at Kirstenbosch Botanical Gardens, Cape Town

Conservation status
- CITES Appendix II (CITES)

Scientific classification
- Kingdom: Plantae
- Clade: Tracheophytes
- Clade: Angiosperms
- Clade: Monocots
- Order: Asparagales
- Family: Asphodelaceae
- Subfamily: Asphodeloideae
- Genus: Aloe
- Species: A. reynoldsii

Binomial name
- Aloe reynoldsii Letty

= Aloe reynoldsii =

Species of succulent

Aloe reynoldsii is a species of plant in the Asphodelaceae family.

== Description ==
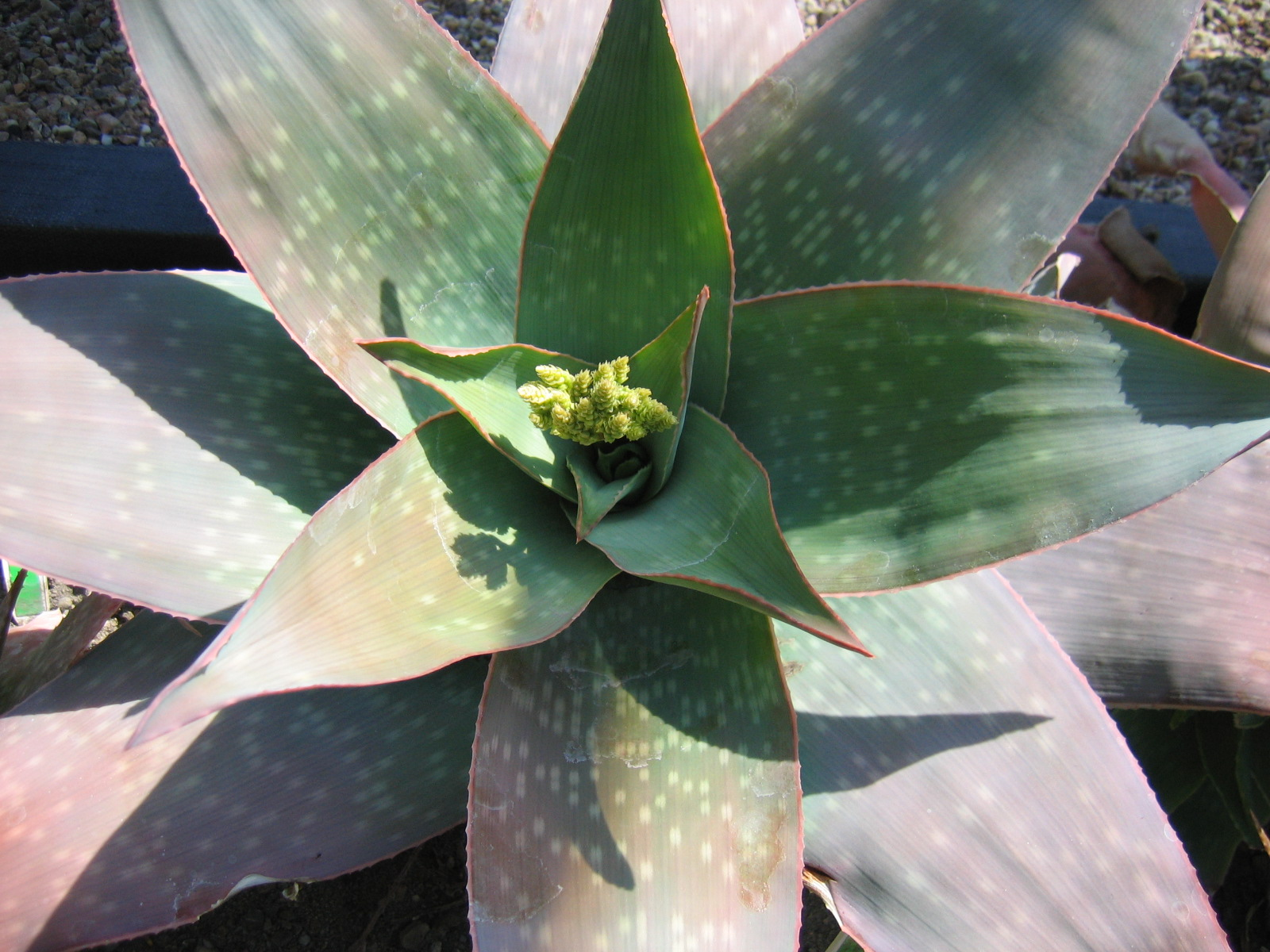
Detail of rosette, and the slightly toothed leaves

Aloe reynoldsii is a succulent without a stem or with very short stems, with leaves gathered in a rosette. The leaves are bluish-green, elongated, fleshy, with a waxy texture, longitudinal lines and with numerous pale green spots and tiny whitish teeth on the margins. The inflorescences show numerous yellow tubular flowers, slightly swollen at the base. The flowering period occurs during September.

Aloe reynoldsii is often confused with its close relative, Aloe striata (the coral aloe), and they do look very similar. However Aloe reynoldsii has waxy, toothed leaf margins and yellow flowers, while the coral aloe has smooth leaf margins and red flowers.

== Distribution and habitat ==
This species is endemic to South Africa. Here it is found naturally in the far east of the Eastern Cape Province, where it occurs on cliffs near the mouth of the Bashee River, in areas with a high humidity factor. It is listed as a vulnerable species.

== See also ==
- Asphodeloideae
- Succulent plants
