= Windburn =

Sunburn obtained in cloudy conditions

Windburn is a condition whereby a sunburn obtained in cool or cloudy conditions is incorrectly attributed to the effects of the wind rather than the sun, mostly in North America. The main reason is that in cool or cloudy conditions many people are unaware that they are still vulnerable to the burning effects of the sun's UV radiation, and fail to take precautionary sun protection measures.

The fact that windburn was really misattributed sunburn, rather than a distinct condition, was shown as early as 1936 by English skin specialist Charles Howard White of Cambridge and American physicist William Henry Crew of New York University. Nonetheless, the accepted existence of windburn remains a widely held misconception.

== Prevention and treatment ==
The treatment of windburn is the same as for sunburn. Prevention measures involve wearing protective clothing, sunscreen, a hat, sunglasses, and seeking shade.

== Wind as a contributing factor ==
There may be contributing factors of the wind to windburn, and similarly, sunburns. Most importantly, the cooling effects of the wind decrease the perception of heat and burning, meaning individuals are less likely to seek shade or to protect themselves against the sun, and are more likely to stay exposed to the burning effects of the sun's UV radiation for longer. Along with being cooling, the wind also has a drying effect on the skin, which may exacerbate the symptoms of a sunburn. There are also some claims that the natural oils and moisture in the skin are reduced in cold conditions, making the skin more vulnerable to the drying effects of the wind and the sun's UV radiation, and thus more easily burnt in situations where people may not expect to be sunburnt, such as in the snow.
