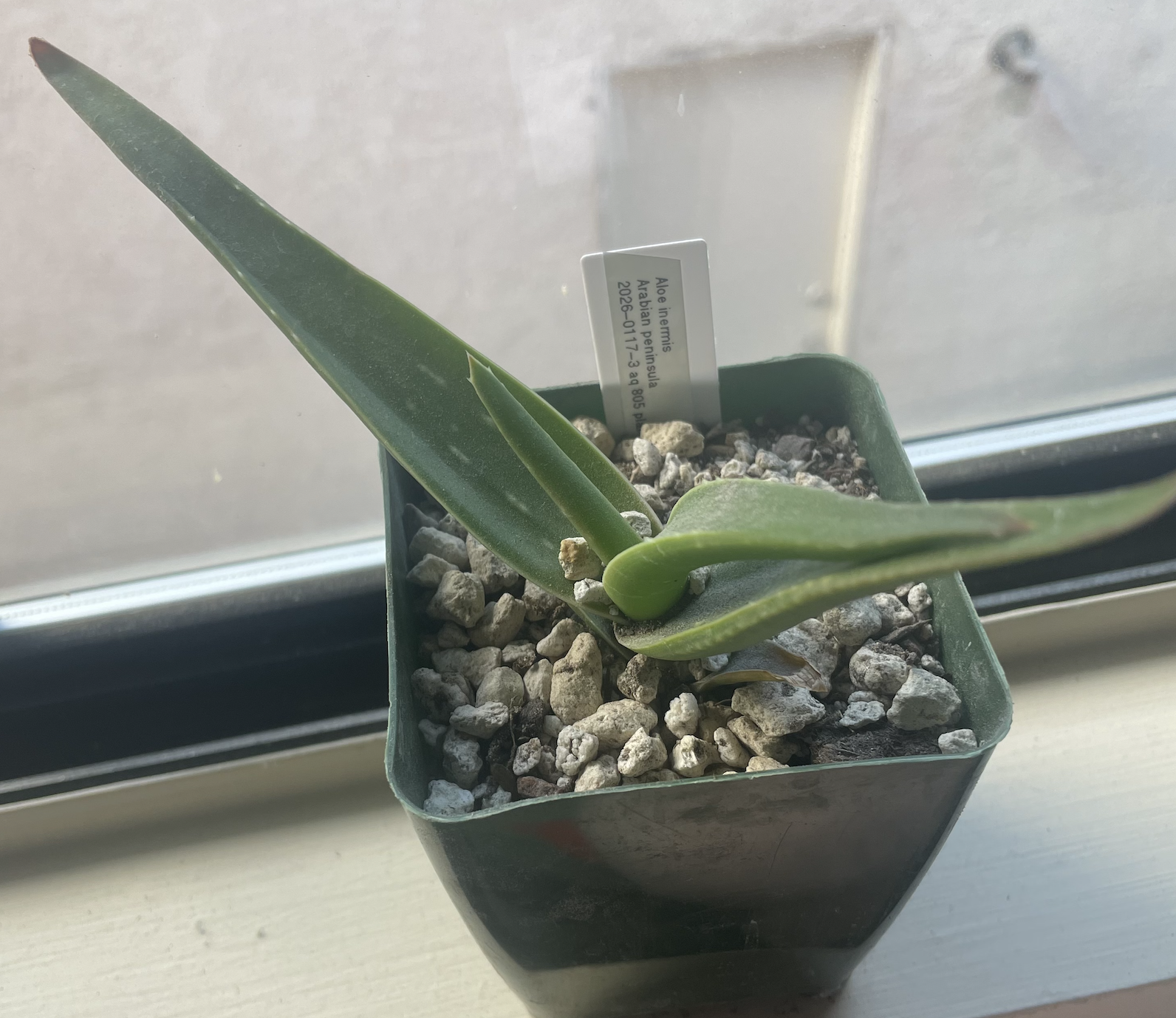

Conservation status
- CITES Appendix II

Scientific classification
- Kingdom: Plantae
- Clade: Embryophytes
- Clade: Tracheophytes
- Clade: Spermatophytes
- Clade: Angiosperms
- Clade: Monocots
- Order: Asparagales
- Family: Asphodelaceae
- Subfamily: Asphodeloideae
- Genus: Aloe
- Species: A. inermis

Binomial name
- Aloe inermis Forssk.

= Aloe inermis =

Species of succulent

Aloe inermis is a small, stemless Aloe native to Arabian Peninsula.

== See also ==
- Succulent plant
