= C9H10N4O4 =

The molecular formula C_{9}H_{10}N_{4}O_{4} may refer to:

- Acefylline
- Acetone 2,4-dinitrophenylhydrazone
