= C10H11NO3 =

The molecular formula C_{10}H_{11}NO_{3} (molar mass: 193.20 g/mol, exact mass: 193.0739 u) may refer to:

- Actarit
- Betamipron
- Methylenedioxycathinone
- Methylhippuric acid
