= C43H66O14 =

The molecular formula C_{43}H_{66}O_{14} (molar mass: 806.98 g/mol, exact mass: 806.4453 u) may refer to:

- Acetyldigitoxin
- Gymnemic acid
