= C19H22N2OS =

The molecular formula C_{19}H_{22}N_{2}OS (molar mass: 326.45 g/mol, exact mass: 326.1453 u) may refer to:

- Acepromazine, or acetylpromazine
- Aceprometazine
- Tiazesim, or thiazesim
