= Leprostatic agent =

Drug that interferes with proliferation of leprosy causing bacterium

A leprostatic agent is a drug that interferes with proliferation of the bacterium that causes leprosy.

The following agents are leprostatic agents:

- acedapsone
- clofazimine
- dapsone
- desoxyfructo-serotonin
- diucifon
- ethionamide
- rifampicin
- rifapentine
- sulfameter
- thalidomide

Leprosy is a chronic infectious disease caused by Mycobacterium leprae. Host defenses are crucial in determining the patient's response to the disease, the clinical presentation, and the bacillary load. These factors also influence the length of therapy and the risk of adverse reactions to medication.

M. leprae cannot be grown on routine laboratory culture media, so drug sensitivity testing in vitro is not possible. Growth and drug susceptibility testing are done by injecting into animal models. One description of a clinical picture that results from tuberculoid leprosy is characterized by intact cell-mediated immunity, a positive lepromin skin reaction, granuloma formation, and a relative paucity of bacilli.

At the other extreme, lepromatous leprosy is characterized by depressed cell-mediated immunity, numerous bacilli within the tissues, no granulomas, and a negative skin test for lepromin. Within these two extremes are the patients with an intermediate or borderline form of leprosy who show a variable lepromin reaction and few bacilli; they may progress to either tuberculoid or lepromatous leprosy.

== Kinds of antileprotic drugs ==
- Sulfone - Dapsone (DDS),
- Phenazine derivative - Clofazimine,
- Antitubercular drugs - Rifampicin, Ethionamide,
- Solapsone,
- Other antibiotics - Ofloxacin, Minocycline, Clarithromycin,

Current recommendations for the treatment of leprosy suggest multidrug regimens rather than monotherapy because such a regimen has proven to be more effective, delays the emergence of resistance, prevents relapse, and shortens the duration of therapy. Established agents used in the treatment of leprosy are dapsone, clofazimine, and rifampicin. Treatment of tuberculoid leprosy is continued for at least 1 to 2 years, while patients with lepromatous leprosy are generally treated for 5 years. In addition to chemotherapy, patients with leprosy need psychosocial support, rehabilitation, and surgical repair of any disfiguration.

=== Dapsone and Sulfones ===
The sulfones are structural analogues of PABA and are competitive inhibitors of folic acid synthesis. Sulfones are bacteriostatic and are used only in the treatment of leprosy. Dapsone (Avlosulfon) is the most widely used sulfone for the long-term therapy of leprosy. Although the sulfones are highly effective against most strains of M. leprae, a small number of organisms, especially those found in lepromatous leprosy patients, are less susceptible and can persist for many years, resulting in relapse. Before the introduction of current multidrug regimens, resistance rates were as high as 20% with dapsone monotherapy.

Sulfones, such as dapsone and sulfoxone (Diasone), are well absorbed orally and are widely distributed throughout body fluids and tissues. Peak concentrations of dapsone are reached within 1 to 3 hours of oral administration and have a half-life of 21 to 44 hours; about 50% of administered dapsone is bound to serum proteins. The sulfones tend to remain in the skin, muscle, kidney, and liver up to 3 weeks after therapy is stopped. The concentration in inflamed skin is 10 to 15 times higher than that found in normal skin. The sulfones are retained in the circulation for a long time (12–35 days) because of hepatobiliary drug recirculation. The sulfones are acetylated in the liver, and 70 to 80% of drug is excreted in the urine as metabolites. Dapsone, combined with other antileprosy agents like rifampicin and clofazimine, is used in the treatment of both multibacillary and paucibacillary M. leprae infections.

Dapsone is also used in the treatment and prevention of Pneumocystis carinii pneumonia in AIDS patients who are allergic to or intolerant of trimethoprim–sulfamethoxazole. Acedapsone is a derivative of dapsone that has little activity against M. leprae but is converted to an active dapsone metabolite. It is a long-acting intramuscular repository form of dapsone with a half-life of 46 days. It may prove useful in leprosy patients who cannot tolerate long-term oral dapsone therapy.

The sulfones can produce non-hemolytic anemia, methemoglobinemia, and sometimes acute hemolytic anemia in persons with a glucose-6-phosphate dehydrogenase deficiency. Within a few weeks of therapy some patients may develop acute skin lesions described as sulfone syndrome or dapsone dermatitis. Some rare side effects include fever, pruritus, paresthesia, reversible neuropathy, and hepatotoxicity.

=== Clofazimine ===
Clofazimine is a weakly bactericidal dye that has some activity against M. leprae. Its precise mechanism of action is unknown but may involve mycobacterial DNA binding. Its oral absorption is quite variable, with 9 to 70% of the drug eliminated in the feces. Clofazimine achieves significant concentrations in tissues, including the phagocytic cells; it has a plasma half-life of 70 days. It is primarily excreted in bile, with less than 1% excretion in urine.

Clofazimine is given to treat sulfone-resistant leprosy or to patients who are intolerant to sulfones. It also exerts an antiinflammatory effect and prevents erythema nodosum leprosum, which can interrupt treatment with dapsone. This is a major advantage of clofazimine over other antileprosy drugs. Ulcerative lesions caused by Mycobacterium ulcerans respond well to clofazimine. It also has some activity against M. tuberculosis and can be used as last resort therapy for the treatment of MDR tuberculosis. The most disturbing adverse reaction to clofazimine is a red-brown discoloration of the skin, especially in light-skinned persons. A rare but serious adverse reaction is acute abdominal pain significant enough to warrant exploratory laparotomy or laparoscopy. Other infrequent side effects include splenic infarction, bowel obstruction, paralytic ileus, and upper GI bleeding.

=== Ethionamide and Prothionamide ===
Ethionamide and prothionamide are weakly bacteriocidal against M. leprae and can be used as alternatives to clofazimine in the treatment of MDR leprosy. Both cause GI intolerance and are expensive.
