= Tuberoid =

Tuberoid can refer to:

- A trade name of the drug Ethionamide
- In some plants, an underground storage organ formed by the swelling of a root
