= Quabodepistat =

Clinical data
- Other names: OPC-167832
- Drug class: Antimycobacterial

Legal status
- Legal status: investigational

Identifiers
- IUPAC name: 5-[[(3R,4R)-1-(4-chloro-2,6-difluorophenyl)-3,4-dihydroxypiperidin-4-yl]methoxy]-8-fluoro-3,4-dihydro-1H-quinolin-2-one
- CAS Number: 1883747-71-4
- PubChem CID: 118904282
- IUPHAR/BPS: 13059
- DrugBank: DB17770
- ChemSpider: 88298183
- UNII: 1PQN78P4S3
- KEGG: D13037
- ChEBI: CHEBI:758664
- ChEMBL: ChEMBL5095080

Chemical and physical data
- Formula: C_{21}H_{20}ClF_{3}N_{2}O_{4}
- Molar mass: 456.85 g·mol^{−1}
- 3D model (JSmol): Interactive image
- SMILES: C1CC(=O)NC2=C(C=CC(=C21)OC[C@@]3(CCN(C[C@H]3O)C4=C(C=C(C=C4F)Cl)F)O)F
- InChI: InChI=InChI=1S/C21H20ClF3N2O4/c22-11-7-14(24)20(15(25)8-11)27-6-5-21(30,17(28)9-27)10-31-16-3-2-13(23)19-12(16)1-4-18(29)26-19/h2-3,7-8,17,28,30H,1,4-6,9-10H2,(H,26,29)/t17-,21-/m1/s1; Key:XZISSTDXPBUCJA-DYESRHJHSA-N

Quabodepistat is an investigational new drug of the antimycobacterial class that is being evaluated by Otsuka Pharmaceutical for the treatment of tuberculosis. It is a DprE1 enzyme inhibitor. DprE1 is required for the synthesis of arabinogalactan, a component of the tuberculosis cell wall, so inhibiting this enzyme disrupts cell wall construction and therefore kills the bacteria.

== Clinical trials ==
Quabodepistat is currently in phase 3 clinical trials for tuberculosis.
