= C14H15NO2 =

The molecular formula C_{14}H_{15}NO_{2} (molar mass : 229.279 g/mol) may refer to:

- Thyronamine
- Acequinoline
