= Acevaltrate =

Names
- Preferred IUPAC name (1S,2′R,6S,7aS)-4-[(Acetyloxy)methyl]-1-[(3-methylbutanoyl)oxy]-6,7a-dihydro-1H-spiro[cyclopenta[c]pyran-7,2′-oxiran]-6-yl 3-(acetyloxy)-3-methylbutanoate
- Other names Acetoxyvaltrate; Acetovaltrate

Identifiers
CAS Number	25161-41-5
3D model (JSmol)	Interactive image
ChEMBL	ChEMBL563350
ChemSpider	59141
ECHA InfoCard	100.042.426
EC Number	246-685-1
PubChem CID	65717
UNII	S9MFK45GY9
CompTox Dashboard (EPA)	DTXSID30179834
- InChI: InChI=1S/C24H32O10/c1-13(2)7-19(27)33-22-21-17(16(11-30-22)10-29-14(3)25)8-18(24(21)12-31-24)32-20(28)9-23(5,6)34-15(4)26/h8,11,13,18,21-22H,7,9-10,12H2,1-6H3/t18-,21+,22-,24+/m0/s1 Key: FWKBQAVMKVZEOT-STCFVSJZSA-N; InChI=1/C24H32O10/c1-13(2)7-19(27)33-22-21-17(16(11-30-22)10-29-14(3)25)8-18(24(21)12-31-24)32-20(28)9-23(5,6)34-15(4)26/h8,11,13,18,21-22H,7,9-10,12H2,1-6H3/t18-,21+,22-,24+/m0/s1 Key: FWKBQAVMKVZEOT-STCFVSJZBV
- SMILES: CC(C)CC(=O)O[C@H]1[C@H]2C(=C[C@@H]([C@]23CO3)OC(=O)CC(C)(C)OC(=O)C)C(=CO1)COC(=O)C

Properties
Chemical formula	C_{24}H_{32}O_{10}
Molar mass	480.510 g·mol^{−1}
Melting point	80–81 °C (176–178 °F; 353–354 K)
- Except where otherwise noted, data are given for materials in their standard state (at 25 °C [77 °F], 100 kPa). Infobox references

Acevaltrate is an iridoid isolated from Valeriana glechomifolia.
