= Sulfametoxydiazine =

Chemical compound

Clinical data
- ATC code: J01ED04 (WHO)

Identifiers
- IUPAC name: 4-amino-N-(5-methoxy-2-pyrimidinyl)benzenesulfonamide
- CAS Number: 651-06-9
- PubChem CID: 5326
- ChemSpider: 5135
- UNII: 3L179F09D6
- KEGG: D02517
- ChEBI: CHEBI:53727
- ChEMBL: ChEMBL1200359
- NIAID ChemDB: 008164
- CompTox Dashboard (EPA): DTXSID5023613
- ECHA InfoCard: 100.010.438

Chemical and physical data
- Formula: C_{11}H_{12}N_{4}O_{3}S
- Molar mass: 280.30 g·mol^{−1}
- 3D model (JSmol): Interactive image
- SMILES: O=S(=O)(Nc1ncc(OC)cn1)c2ccc(N)cc2
- InChI: InChI=1S/C11H12N4O3S/c1-18-9-6-13-11(14-7-9)15-19(16,17)10-4-2-8(12)3-5-10/h2-7H,12H2,1H3,(H,13,14,15); Key:GPTONYMQFTZPKC-UHFFFAOYSA-N

Sulfametoxydiazine (INN) or sulfamethoxydiazine (USAN: sulfameter) is a long-acting sulfonamide antibacterial. It is used as a leprostatic agent and in the treatment of urinary tract infections.

Sulfamethoxydiazine is also used to treat and prevent diseases in animals. Because of its relatively long persistence, sulfamethoxydiazine residue can be detected in meat, dairy, and eggs, and is considered hazardous to human health. The United States and Japan both prohibit sulfamethoxydiazine residue in food, whereas the Codex Alimentarius Commission states that the maximum limit for sulfonamides in animal tissues is 100 μg/kg.
