= Etanautine =

Chemical compound

Clinical data
- ATC code: N04AB01 (WHO)

Identifiers
- IUPAC name: 2-[di(phenyl)methoxy]-N,N-dimethylethanamine; 2-(1,3-dimethyl-2,6-dioxopurin-7-yl)acetic acid
- CAS Number: 857401-00-4
- ChemSpider: 8430627
- UNII: 97H5S09M4T

Chemical and physical data
- Formula: C_{26}H_{31}N_{5}O_{5}
- Molar mass: 493.564 g·mol^{−1}
- 3D model (JSmol): Interactive image
- SMILES: O=C2N(c1ncn(c1C(=O)N2C)CC(=O)O)C.O(CCN(C)C)C(c1ccccc1)c2ccccc2
- InChI: InChI=1S/C17H21NO.C9H10N4O4/c1-18(2)13-14-19-17(15-9-5-3-6-10-15)16-11-7-4-8-12-16;1-11-7-6(8(16)12(2)9(11)17)13(4-10-7)3-5(14)15/h3-12,17H,13-14H2,1-2H3;4H,3H2,1-2H3,(H,14,15); Key:UFKLOBYBVCBTBP-UHFFFAOYSA-N

Etanautine, also known as diphenhydramine monoacefyllinate, is an anticholinergic used as an antiparkinsonian agent. It is a 1:1 salt of diphenhydramine with acefylline, similar to the diphenhydramine/8-chlorotheophylline combination product dimenhydrinate.

As with dimenhydrinate, the stimulant effect of the etanautine counteracts the sedative effect from the diphenhydramine, resulting in an improved therapeutic profile.

The 1:2 salt diphenhydramine diacefylline (with two molecules of acefylline to each molecule of diphenhydramine) is also used in medicine, under the brand name Nautamine.
