= Solasulfone =

Names
- IUPAC name Tetrasodium 3,3'-[sulfonylbis(benzene-4,1-diylimino)]bis(1-phenylpropane-1,3-disulfonate)
- Other names Solapsone; Sulfetrone

Identifiers
CAS Number	133-65-3
3D model (JSmol)	Interactive image
ChemSpider	8305
ECHA InfoCard	100.004.652
PubChem CID	8626
UNII	H12JE4313S
CompTox Dashboard (EPA)	DTXSID50927894
- InChI: InChI=1S/C30H32N2O14S5.4Na/c33-47(34,25-15-11-23(12-16-25)31-29(50(41,42)43)19-27(48(35,36)37)21-7-3-1-4-8-21)26-17-13-24(14-18-26)32-30(51(44,45)46)20-28(49(38,39)40)22-9-5-2-6-10-22;;;;/h1-18,27-32H,19-20H2,(H,35,36,37)(H,38,39,40)(H,41,42,43)(H,44,45,46);;;;/q;4*+1/p-4
- SMILES: [Na+].[Na+].[Na+].[Na+].[O-]S(=O)(=O)C(c1ccccc1)CC(Nc2ccc(cc2)S(=O)(=O)c4ccc(NC(S([O-])(=O)=O)CC(c3ccccc3)S([O-])(=O)=O)cc4)S([O-])(=O)=O

Properties
Chemical formula	C_{30}H_{28}N_{2}Na_{4}O_{14}S_{5}
Molar mass	892.81 g·mol^{−1}
- Except where otherwise noted, data are given for materials in their standard state (at 25 °C [77 °F], 100 kPa). Infobox references

Solasulfone is an antileprotic drug developed from the parent compound sulphetrone. It was first described and evaluated in the 1930s and 1940s as an antibacterial agent for the treatment of tuberculosis and various other infections, and later found to be effective in the treatment of leprosy.
