= Diucifon =

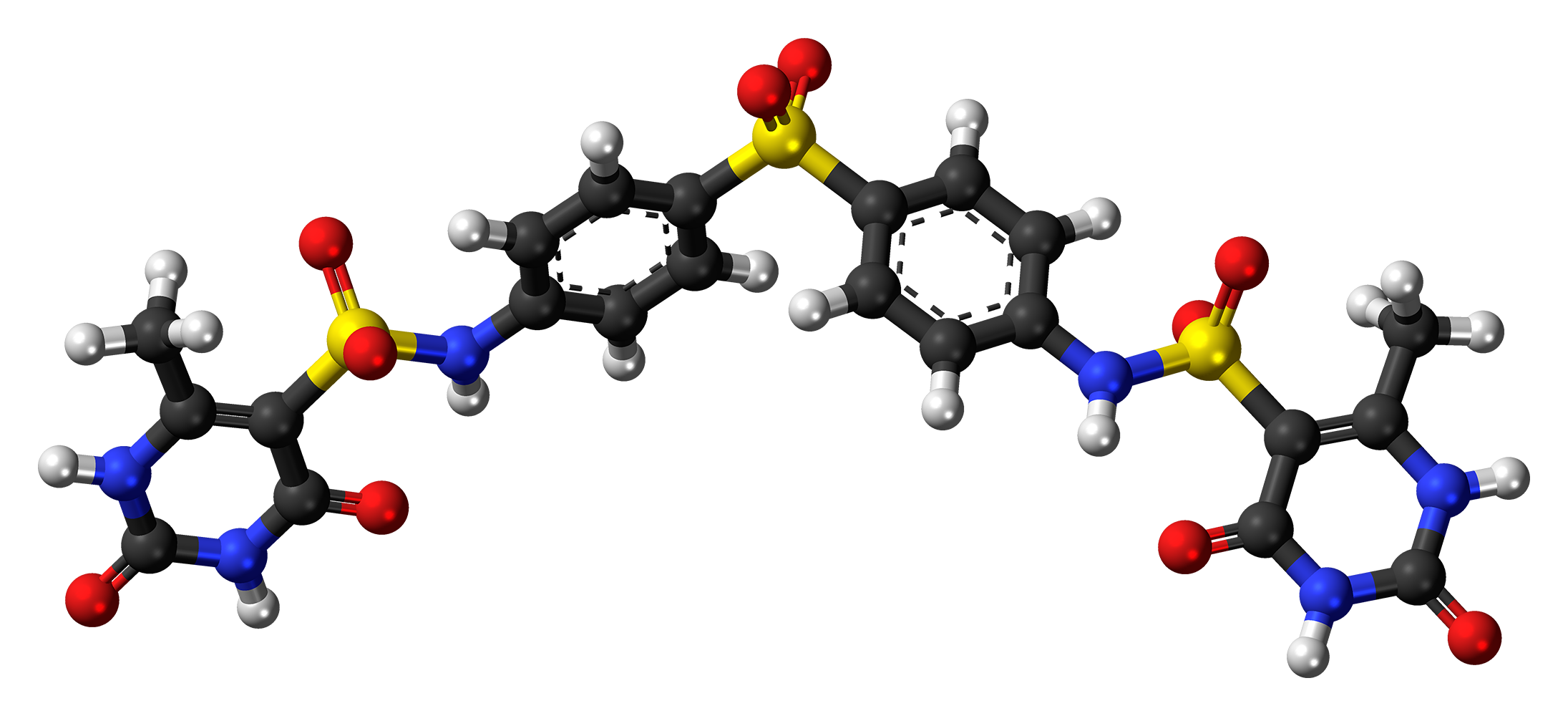

Names
- Preferred IUPAC name N,N′-[Sulfonyldi(4,1-phenylene)]bis(6-methyl-2,4-dioxo-1,2,3,4-tetrahydropyrimidine-5-sulfonamide)

Identifiers
CAS Number	34941-71-4
3D model (JSmol)	Interactive image
ChemSpider	108939
MeSH	Diucifon
PubChem CID	122139
UNII	H2J64M9K8Z
CompTox Dashboard (EPA)	DTXSID90956401
- InChI: InChI=1S/C22H20N6O10S3/c1-11-17(19(29)25-21(31)23-11)40(35,36)27-13-3-7-15(8-4-13)39(33,34)16-9-5-14(6-10-16)28-41(37,38)18-12(2)24-22(32)26-20(18)30/h3-10,27-28H,1-2H3,(H2,23,25,29,31)(H2,24,26,30,32) Key: DVAIYSZTXVOUQZ-UHFFFAOYSA-N
- SMILES: Cc1c(c(=O)[nH]c(=O)[nH]1)S(=O)(=O)Nc2ccc(cc2)S(=O)(=O)c3ccc(cc3)NS(=O)(=O)c4c([nH]c(=O)[nH]c4=O)C

Properties
Chemical formula	C_{22}H_{20}N_{6}O_{10}S_{3}
Molar mass	624.6234
- Except where otherwise noted, data are given for materials in their standard state (at 25 °C [77 °F], 100 kPa). verify (what is ?) Infobox references

Diucifon is a leprostatic agent.

== See also ==
- List of Russian drugs
