= Antimycobacterial =

Class of pharmaceutical compounds

An antimycobacterial is a type of medication used to treat Mycobacteria infections.

Types include:

- Tuberculosis treatments
- Leprostatic agents
