= Desoxyfructo-serotonin =

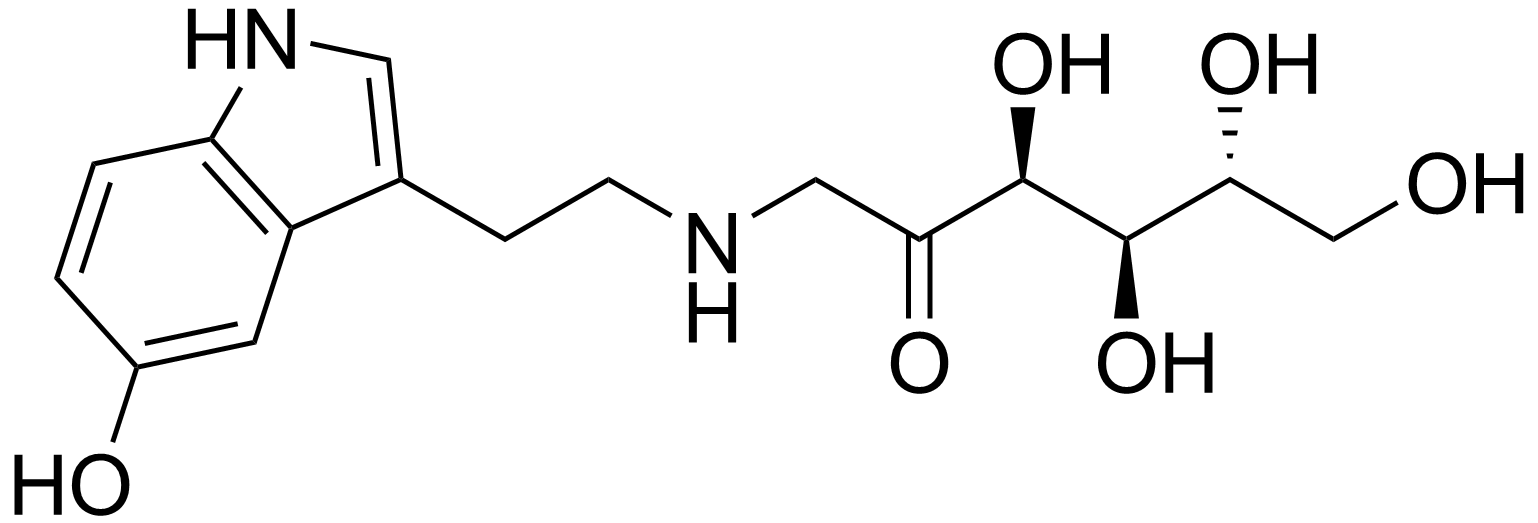

Names
- IUPAC name 1-Deoxy-1-{[2-(5-hydroxy-1H-indol-3-yl)ethyl]amino}-D-fructose
- Systematic IUPAC name (3S,4R,5R)-3,4,5,6-Tetrahydroxy-1-{[2-(5-hydroxy-1H-indol-3-yl)ethyl]amino}hexan-2-one
- Other names Deoxyfructo-serotonin; Desoxyfructosylserotonin; 1-Desoxy-(5-hydroxytryptamino)-D-fructose

Identifiers
CAS Number	57003-86-8
3D model (JSmol)	Interactive image
ChemSpider	19981061
MeSH	Desoxyfructo-serotonin
PubChem CID	21120559
UNII	ZAY677NEC4
CompTox Dashboard (EPA)	DTXSID90972500
- InChI: InChI=1S/C16H22N2O6/c19-8-14(22)16(24)15(23)13(21)7-17-4-3-9-6-18-12-2-1-10(20)5-11(9)12/h1-2,5-6,14-20,22-24H,3-4,7-8H2/t14-,15-,16-/m1/s1 Key: CKNYSJONUIBYCK-BZUAXINKSA-N; InChI=1/C16H22N2O6/c19-8-14(22)16(24)15(23)13(21)7-17-4-3-9-6-18-12-2-1-10(20)5-11(9)12/h1-2,5-6,14-20,22-24H,3-4,7-8H2/t14-,15-,16-/m1/s1 Key: CKNYSJONUIBYCK-BZUAXINKBK
- SMILES: C1=CC2=C(C=C1O)C(=CN2)CCNCC(=O)[C@H]([C@@H]([C@@H](CO)O)O)O

Properties
Chemical formula	C_{16}H_{22}N_{2}O_{6}
Molar mass	338.360 g·mol^{−1}
- Except where otherwise noted, data are given for materials in their standard state (at 25 °C [77 °F], 100 kPa). verify (what is ?) Infobox references

Desoxyfructo-serotonin is a leprostatic agent.
