= Acefylline clofibrol =

Chemical compound

Clinical data
- Routes of administration: Intramuscular, Intravenous

Identifiers
- IUPAC name: 2-(4-Chlorophenoxy)-2-methylpropyl (1,3-dimethyl-2,6-dioxo-1,2,3,6-tetrahydro-7H-purin-7-yl)acetate
- CAS Number: 70788-27-1
- PubChem CID: 68898
- ChemSpider: 62127
- UNII: WY672D78VW
- ChEMBL: ChEMBL2104056
- CompTox Dashboard (EPA): DTXSID60221052

Chemical and physical data
- Formula: C_{19}H_{21}ClN_{4}O_{5}
- Molar mass: 420.85 g·mol^{−1}
- 3D model (JSmol): Interactive image
- SMILES: Clc3ccc(OC(C)(C)COC(=O)Cn1c2c(nc1)N(C(=O)N(C2=O)C)C)cc3
- InChI: InChI=1S/C19H21ClN4O5/c1-19(2,29-13-7-5-12(20)6-8-13)10-28-14(25)9-24-11-21-16-15(24)17(26)23(4)18(27)22(16)3/h5-8,11H,9-10H2,1-4H3; Key:ICVMNUSJJHSLLM-UHFFFAOYSA-N

Acefylline clofibrol is a derivative of acefylline and clofibrate used as a hypolipidemic agent.
