= Decaprenylphospho-beta-D-ribofuranose 2-oxidase =

Identifiers
- EC no.: 1.1.98.3

Databases
- IntEnz: IntEnz view
- BRENDA: BRENDA entry
- ExPASy: NiceZyme view
- KEGG: KEGG entry
- MetaCyc: metabolic pathway
- PRIAM: profile
- PDB structures: RCSB PDB PDBe PDBsum
Search
- PMC: articles
- PubMed: articles
- NCBI: proteins

Decaprenylphospho-beta-D-ribofuranose 2-oxidase (EC 1.1.98.3, decaprenylphosphoryl-beta-D-ribofuranose 2'-epimerase, Rv3790, DprE1) is an enzyme with systematic name trans,octacis-decaprenylphospho-beta-D-ribofuranose:FAD 2-oxidoreductase. This enzyme catalyses the following chemical reaction

trans,octacis-decaprenylphospho-beta-D-ribofuranose + FAD $\rightleftharpoons$ trans,octacis-decaprenylphospho-beta-D-erythro-pentofuranosid-2-ulose + FADH_{2}

This enzyme from the bacterium Mycobacterium smegmatis participates in epimerization of trans,octacis-decaprenylphospho-beta-D-ribofuranose to trans,octacis-decaprenylphospho-beta-D-arabinoofuranose.

Macozinone and quabodepistat are two investigational drugs that target DprE1.
