= Aceglatone =

Antineoplastic drug available in Japan

Clinical data
- Trade names: Glucaron
- Other names: D-Glucaric acid di-γ-lactone 2,5-diacetate 2,5-Di-O-acetyl-D-glucaro-1,4:6,3-dilactone; 2,5-Di-O-acetyl-D-glucosaccharo-1,4:6,3-dilactone
- AHFS/Drugs.com: International Drug Names
- ATC code: none

Identifiers
- IUPAC name: (3R,3aR,6S,6aR)-2,5-Dioxohexahydrofuro[3,2-b]furan-3,6-diyl diacetate
- CAS Number: 642-83-1
- PubChem CID: 636372
- ChemSpider: 599998
- UNII: 347Q3OOJ13
- ChEMBL: ChEMBL2103781
- CompTox Dashboard (EPA): DTXSID0048848

Chemical and physical data
- Formula: C_{10}H_{10}O_{8}
- Molar mass: 258.182 g·mol^{−1}
- 3D model (JSmol): Interactive image
- Melting point: 185 to 186 °C (365 to 367 °F)
- SMILES: O=C1O[C@H]2[C@@H](OC(=O)C)C(=O)O[C@H]2[C@@H]1OC(=O)C
- InChI: InChI=1S/C10H10O8/c1-3(11)15-7-5-6(18-9(7)13)8(10(14)17-5)16-4(2)12/h5-8H,1-2H3/t5-,6-,7-,8+/m1/s1; Key:ZOZKYEHVNDEUCO-XUTVFYLZSA-N

Aceglatone (Glucaron) is an antineoplastic drug available in Japan.

It is an inhibitor of the enzyme β-glucuronidase.
