= Actisomide =

Names
- Preferred IUPAC name (4R,4aR)-4-{2-[Di(propan-2-yl)amino]ethyl}-1-methyl-4-phenyl-4,4a,5,6,7,8-hexahydro-3H-pyrido[1,2-c]pyrimidin-3-one

Identifiers
CAS Number	96914-39-5
3D model (JSmol)	Interactive image
ChEMBL	ChEMBL286259
ChemSpider	5293118
KEGG	D02762
MeSH	C051827
PubChem CID	6917898
UNII	IJQ29N87NR
CompTox Dashboard (EPA)	DTXSID001026019
- InChI: InChI=1S/C23H35N3O/c1-17(2)25(18(3)4)16-14-23(20-11-7-6-8-12-20)21-13-9-10-15-26(21)19(5)24-22(23)27/h6-8,11-12,17-18,21H,9-10,13-16H2,1-5H3/t21-,23-/m1/s1 Key: QAHRRCMLXFLZTF-FYYLOGMGSA-N
- SMILES: CC1=NC(=O)[C@]([C@@H]2N1CCCC2)(CCN(C(C)C)C(C)C)C3=CC=CC=C3

Properties
Chemical formula	C_{23}H_{35}N_{3}O
Molar mass	369.553 g·mol^{−1}
- Except where otherwise noted, data are given for materials in their standard state (at 25 °C [77 °F], 100 kPa). Infobox references

Actisomide is an antiarrhythmic drug that is made from disopyramide.

== Synthesis ==
Actisomide synthesis:
