= Acediasulfone =

Chemical compound

Clinical data
- ATC code: none

Identifiers
- IUPAC name: 2-([4-(4-aminophenyl)sulfonylphenyl]amino)acetic acid
- CAS Number: 80-03-5
- PubChem CID: 66451
- DrugBank: DB08926
- ChemSpider: 59823
- UNII: 30YP2YHH8W
- KEGG: D07061
- ChEMBL: ChEMBL48396
- CompTox Dashboard (EPA): DTXSID00229991
- ECHA InfoCard: 100.001.131

Chemical and physical data
- Formula: C_{14}H_{14}N_{2}O_{4}S
- Molar mass: 306.34 g·mol^{−1}
- 3D model (JSmol): Interactive image
- SMILES: C1=CC(=CC=C1N)S(=O)(=O)C2=CC=C(C=C2)NCC(=O)O
- InChI: InChI=1S/C14H14N2O4S/c15-10-1-5-12(6-2-10)21(19,20)13-7-3-11(4-8-13)16-9-14(17)18/h1-8,16H,9,15H2,(H,17,18); Key:FKKUMFTYSTZUJG-UHFFFAOYSA-N

Acediasulfone (INN) is an antimicrobial drug, which also has antimalarial activity. It is a long-acting prodrug of dapsone, which is used for treating leprosy.

== Synthesis ==
Dapsone is somewhat inconvenient to administer to patients because of its rather low water solubility.

Acediasulfone synthesis: CH 254803 and CH 278482 (1949, 1952, to Cilag Ltd.); Rawlins, U.S. patent 2,589,211 (1952 to Parke-Davis).

In the search for more easily administered drugs, dapsone (1) was reacted with bromoacetic acid to give acediasulfone (2) which can be administered as a water-soluble salt.
