= Aceperone =

Chemical compound

Clinical data
- Other names: Acetabuton; R 3248
- ATC code: none

Identifiers
- IUPAC name: N-({1-[4-(4-Fluorophenyl)-4-oxobutyl]-4-phenyl-4-piperidinyl}methyl)acetamide
- CAS Number: 807-31-8
- PubChem CID: 13122
- ChemSpider: 12570
- UNII: S69KXZ59AB
- ChEMBL: ChEMBL136298
- CompTox Dashboard (EPA): DTXSID30230510

Chemical and physical data
- Formula: C_{24}H_{29}FN_{2}O_{2}
- Molar mass: 396.506 g·mol^{−1}
- 3D model (JSmol): Interactive image
- Melting point: 97 to 100 °C (207 to 212 °F)
- SMILES: Fc1ccc(cc1)C(=O)CCCN3CCC(c2ccccc2)(CC3)CNC(=O)C
- InChI: InChI=1S/C24H29FN2O2/c1-19(28)26-18-24(21-6-3-2-4-7-21)13-16-27(17-14-24)15-5-8-23(29)20-9-11-22(25)12-10-20/h2-4,6-7,9-12H,5,8,13-18H2,1H3,(H,26,28); Key:VDGZERMDPAAZEJ-UHFFFAOYSA-N

Aceperone is a neuroleptic drug of the butyrophenone class. It is an α-noradrenergic blocking drug developed by Janssen Pharmaceutica in the 1960s.

Aceperone has been used as a tool in the study of the biochemical basis of learning. Although aceperone does not block learning per se, it blocks access to an attentional mechanism by which animals ‘tune in’ to the relevant visual dimension when learning a visual discrimination task at doses below those that affect general behaviour.
