= Actaplanin =

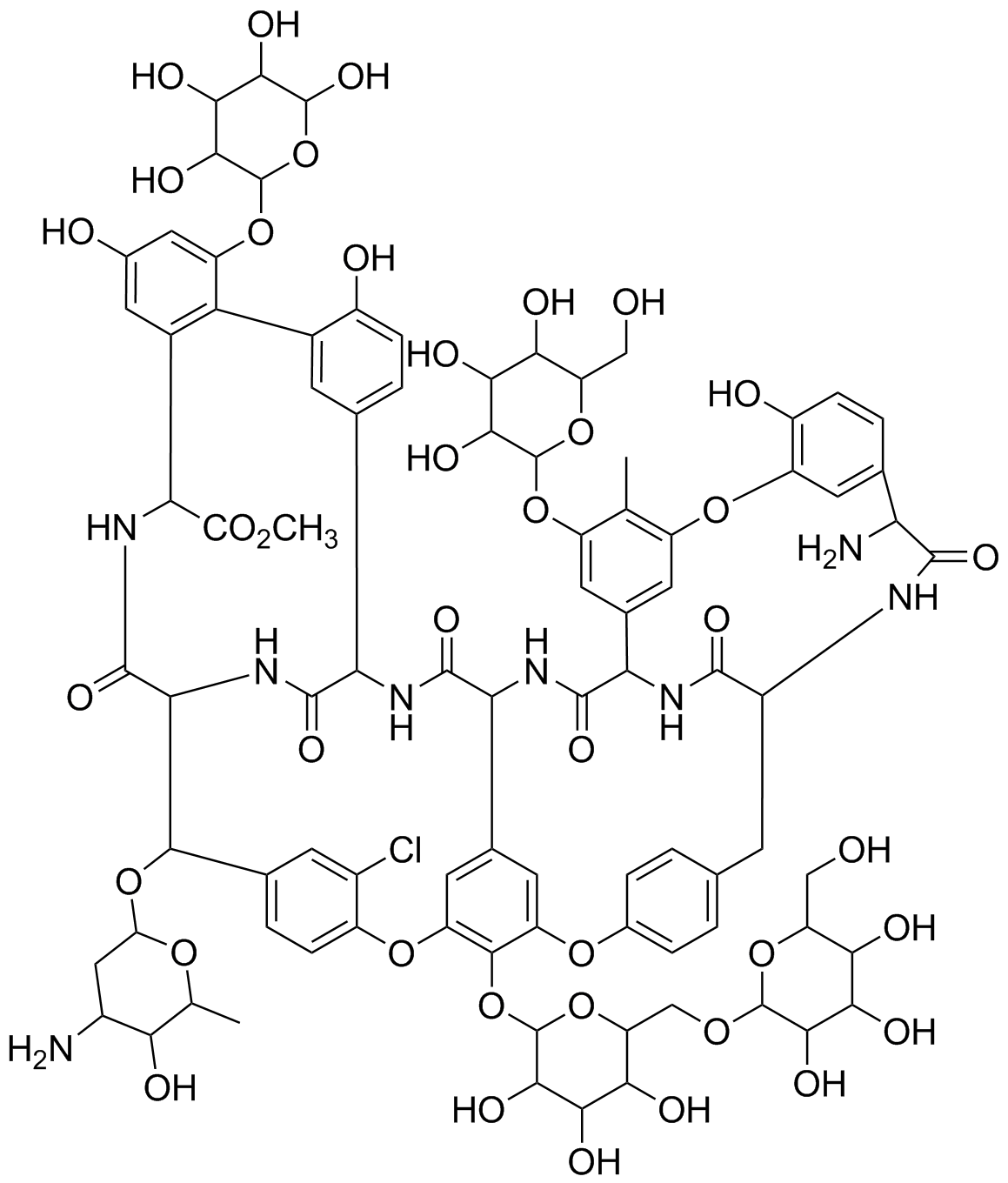

Names
- Other names Antibiotic A 4696, Kamoran

Identifiers
CAS Number	37305-75-2
3D model (JSmol)	Interactive image
ChemSpider	17289019
PubChem CID	16132360
UNII	BIC0KCT1E9
- InChI: InChI=1S/C90H101ClN8O40/c1-29-47-18-35(19-48(29)132-88-75(116)71(112)67(108)54(26-101)135-88)61-83(122)97-62-36-20-51(129-38-9-4-31(5-10-38)14-43(80(119)95-61)94-81(120)59(93)32-6-12-45(105)49(17-32)131-47)79(139-90-77(118)73(114)69(110)56(137-90)28-127-87-74(115)70(111)66(107)53(25-100)134-87)52(21-36)130-46-13-8-34(16-41(46)91)78(138-57-24-42(92)65(106)30(2)128-57)64-85(124)98-63(86(125)126-3)40-22-37(103)23-50(133-89-76(117)72(113)68(109)55(27-102)136-89)58(40)39-15-33(7-11-44(39)104)60(82(121)99-64)96-84(62)123/h4-13,15-23,30,42-43,53-57,59-78,87-90,100-118H,14,24-28,92-93H2,1-3H3,(H,94,120)(H,95,119)(H,96,123)(H,97,122)(H,98,124)(H,99,121) Key: PFEBYWJUETVBLJ-UHFFFAOYSA-N
- SMILES: CC1C(C(CC(O1)OC2C3C(=O)NC(C4=C(C(=CC(=C4)O)OC5C(C(C(C(O5)CO)O)O)O)C6=C(C=CC(=C6)C(C(=O)N3)NC(=O)C7C8=CC(=C(C(=C8)OC9=C(C=C2C=C9)Cl)OC1C(C(C(C(O1)COC1C(C(C(C(O1)CO)O)O)O)O)O)O)OC1=CC=C(CC2C(=O)NC(C3=CC(=C(C(=C3)OC3C(C(C(C(O3)CO)O)O)O)C)OC3=C(C=CC(=C3)C(C(=O)N2)N)O)C(=O)N7)C=C1)O)C(=O)OC)N)O
- Except where otherwise noted, data are given for materials in their standard state (at 25 °C [77 °F], 100 kPa). Infobox references

Actaplanin is a complex of broad-spectrum antibiotics made by Actinoplanes bacteria. Research carried out by a group in Eli Lilly and Co. in 1984 identified several actaplanins using high-performance liquid chromatography. Actaplanins A, B_{1}, B_{2}, B_{3}, C_{1} and G were shown to be composed of the same peptide core, an amino sugar, and varying amounts of glucose, mannose, and rhamnose.

== See also ==
- Ristocetin (contains the same amino sugar as in actaplanin)
