= Acetone 2,4-dinitrophenylhydrazone =

Names
- IUPAC name 2,4-Dinitro-N-(propan-2-ylideneamino)aniline
- Other names Acetone-2,4-DNPH

Identifiers
CAS Number	1567-89-1
3D model (JSmol)	Interactive image
ChemSpider	66687
EC Number	625-639-8
PubChem CID	74069
UNII	8YD67RV9SJ
CompTox Dashboard (EPA)	DTXSID1061788
- InChI: InChI=1S/C9H10N4O4/c1-6(2)10-11-8-4-3-7(12(14)15)5-9(8)13(16)17/h3-5,11H,1-2H3 Key: YGIXYAIGWMAGIB-UHFFFAOYSA-N
- SMILES: CC(=NNC1=C(C=C(C=C1)[N+](=O)[O-])[N+](=O)[O-])C

Properties
Chemical formula	C_{9}H_{10}N_{4}O_{4}
Molar mass	238.203 g·mol^{−1}
log P	3.05

Hazards
- GHS labelling
Pictograms	(GHS07: Exclamation mark)
Signal word	Warning
Hazard statements	H315, H319, H335
Precautionary statements	P261, P264, P264+P265, P271, P280, P302+P352, P304+P340, P305+P351+P338, P319, P321, P332+P317, P337+P317, P362+P364, P403+P233, P405, P501
- Except where otherwise noted, data are given for materials in their standard state (at 25 °C [77 °F], 100 kPa). Infobox references

Acetone 2,4-dinitrophenylhydrazone, or acetone-2,4-DNPH, is a chemical compound that is the product of the reaction between acetone and 2,4-dinitrophenylhydrazine (DNPH). As a reagent in analytical chemistry, DNPH is commonly used for the sensitive and specific detection of acetone and ketone bodies. Its use allows researchers and environmental scientists to reliably measure low concentrations of these compounds, which are important markers in both biological and industrial contexts.

== Chemistry ==
Acetone-2,4-DNPH is a crystalline derivative formed from the reaction of acetone with 2,4-dinitrophenylhydrazine.

== Environmental and emissions testing ==
Acetone-2,4-DNPH serves a role in tracking carbonyl compounds within environmental air samples, industrial vehicle emissions, and mainstream cigarette smoke. Air is passed through cartridges coated with 2,4-DNPH; any ambient acetone traps on the matrix as acetone 2,4-dinitrophenylhydrazone. The complex is subsequently eluted and analyzed using high-performance liquid chromatography or UV-Vis spectrophotometry.
