= Acellular nerve allograft =

Peripheral nerve scaffold

Clinical data
- Trade names: Avance
- Other names: acellular nerve allograft-arwx
- License data: US DailyMed: Acellular nerve allograft
- ATC code: None

Legal status
- Legal status: US: ℞-only

Acellular nerve allograft, sold under the brand name Avance, is a peripheral nerve scaffold.

The most common adverse reactions include procedural pain and increased sensitivity to sensory stimuli, such as touch, temperature, and pain (hyperesthesia).

Acellular nerve allograft was approved for medical use in the United States in December 2025.

== Medical uses ==
Acellular nerve allograft is indicated for the treatment of people with sensory nerve discontinuity and mixed and motor nerve discontinuity.

Acellular nerve allograft is made using nerve tissue from deceased donors (cadavers) that has been specially processed to remove cells while preserving the natural structure that helps nerves regrow.

== Society and culture ==
=== Legal status ===
Acellular nerve allograft was approved for medical use in the United States in December 2025.

The US Food and Drug Administration granted approval of acellular nerve allograft to Axogen.
