= Ibrilatazar =

Chemical compound

Clinical data
- Other names: α-Hydroxylinoleic acid; 2-Hydroxylinoleic acid; ABTL-0812

Legal status
- Legal status: Investigational

Identifiers
- IUPAC name: (9Z,12Z)-2-Hydroxyoctadeca-9,12-dienoic acid
- CAS Number: 57818-44-7
- PubChem CID: 21158511
- ChemSpider: 20118100
- UNII: 0DE74TJ7EZ
- ChEBI: CHEBI:136927
- CompTox Dashboard (EPA): DTXSID301258077

Chemical and physical data
- Formula: C_{18}H_{32}O_{3}
- Molar mass: 296.451 g·mol^{−1}
- 3D model (JSmol): Interactive image
- SMILES: CCCCC/C=C\C/C=C\CCCCCCC(C(=O)O)O
- InChI: InChI=1S/C18H32O3/c1-2-3-4-5-6-7-8-9-10-11-12-13-14-15-16-17(19)18(20)21/h6-7,9-10,17,19H,2-5,8,11-16H2,1H3,(H,20,21)/b7-6-,10-9-; Key:AFDSETGKYZMEEA-HZJYTTRNSA-N

Ibrilatazar also known as α-hydroxylinoleic acid is a small-molecule, experimental cancer drug being developed by Ability Pharmaceuticals.

== History ==
In 2015, Ability announced that it had received orphan drug designation (ODD) for pediatric cancer neuroblastoma from the European Medical Agency (EMA) and the US Food and Drug Administration (FDA). Also in 2016 a preclinical study confirmed that ABTL0812 was well tolerated. In December 2016 the company announced Ibrilatazar has received an Orphan Drug Designation for the treatment of pancreatic cancer.

== Mechanism of action ==
One mechanism of action is the activation of the PPAR-alpha and PPAR-gamma receptors which in turn up-regulate the expression of the TRIB3 gene, leading to inhibition of the PI3K/AKT/mTOR pathway. This pathway is excessively activated in most human cancers, supporting tumor growth. It is a principal target of various new anti-tumour drugs. Tumor cells are killed via autophagic cell death, rather than apoptosis.

ABTL0812 activates the PPAR receptors, inducing TRIB3 over-expression. TRIB3 binds to the Akt oncogene and inhibits the Akt/mTOR axis.

== Clinical trials ==
ABTL0812 showed efficacy in Phase I clinical trials in patients with advanced cancer, with low toxicity and high tolerability.
