= Acetiromate =

Chemical compound

Clinical data
- ATC code: none

Identifiers
- IUPAC name: 4-(4-acetyloxy-3-iodophenoxy)-3,5-diiodobenzoic acid
- CAS Number: 2260-08-4
- PubChem CID: 16748
- ChemSpider: 15877
- UNII: 8Q5153W1NW
- ChEMBL: ChEMBL2105921
- CompTox Dashboard (EPA): DTXSID60177121

Chemical and physical data
- Formula: C_{15}H_{9}I_{3}O_{5}
- Molar mass: 649.945 g·mol^{−1}
- 3D model (JSmol): Interactive image
- SMILES: CC(=O)OC1=C(C=C(C=C1)OC2=C(C=C(C=C2I)C(=O)O)I)I
- InChI: InChI=1S/C15H9I3O5/c1-7(19)22-13-3-2-9(6-10(13)16)23-14-11(17)4-8(15(20)21)5-12(14)18/h2-6H,1H3,(H,20,21); Key:AXVCIZJRCOHMQX-UHFFFAOYSA-N

Acetiromate is an antilipidemic drug which is used to treat hyperlipidemia. It is also known as Adecol, TBF 43, or acetyltriiodothyronine formic acid.
