= Acivicin =

Inhibitor of gamma-glutamyl transferase

Names
- IUPAC name (2S)-Amino[(5S)-3-chloro-4,5-dihydro-1,2-oxazol-5-yl]ethanoic acid
- Other names Antibiotic AT 125

Identifiers
CAS Number	42228-92-2
3D model (JSmol)	Interactive image
ChEBI	CHEBI:74545
ChEMBL	ChEMBL1231101
ChemSpider	259938
PubChem CID	294641
UNII	O0X60K76I6
CompTox Dashboard (EPA)	DTXSID0046010
- InChI: InChI=1S/C5H7ClN2O3/c6-3-1-2(11-8-3)4(7)5(9)10/h2,4H,1,7H2,(H,9,10)/t2-,4-/m0/s1 Key: QAWIHIJWNYOLBE-OKKQSCSOSA-N; InChI=1S/C5H7ClN2O3/c6-3-1-2(11-8-3)4(7)5(9)10/h2,4H,1,7H2,(H,9,10)/t2-,4-/m0/s1
- SMILES: Cl\C1=N\O[C@H]([C@@H](C(=O)O)N)C1

Properties
Chemical formula	C_{5}H_{7}ClN_{2}O_{3}
Molar mass	178.574
- Except where otherwise noted, data are given for materials in their standard state (at 25 °C [77 °F], 100 kPa). verify (what is ?) Infobox references

Acivicin is an analog of glutamine. It is an inhibitor of gamma-glutamyl transferase.

It is a fermentation product of Streptomyces sviceus. It interferes with glutamate metabolism and inhibits glutamate dependent synthesis of enzymes, and is thereby potentially helpful in the treatment of solid tumors.

After its discovery in 1972, acivicin was studied as an anti-cancer agent, but trials were unsuccessful due to toxicity.

== Research ==
An in vitro study showed that Acivicin at a concentration of 5 μM Acivicin inhibited by 78% the growth of human pancreatic carcinoma cells (MIA PaCa-2) after 72 hours in continuous culture. It was also found that acivicin at a concentration of 450 μM irreversibly inactivated MIA PaCa-2 γ-glutamyl transpeptidase (10 nmol/min/10^{6} cells) with an inactivation half-life of 80 minutes.

=== Phase I studies ===
Phase I dose escalating studies conducted in 23 cancer patients administered acivicin with a concomitant 96-h i.v. infusion of a mixture of 16 amino acids showed reversible, dose-limiting CNS toxicity, characterized by lethargy, confusion and decreased mental status.
