= Actinoquinol =

Names
- Preferred IUPAC name 8-Ethoxyquinoline-5-sulfonic acid

Identifiers
CAS Number	15301-40-3
3D model (JSmol)	Interactive image
ChEMBL	ChEMBL1356732
ChemSpider	22136
ECHA InfoCard	100.035.743
EC Number	239-334-9
KEGG	D02761
PubChem CID	23674
UNII	470VQE23O3
CompTox Dashboard (EPA)	DTXSID4046521
- InChI: InChI=1S/C11H11NO4S/c1-2-16-9-5-6-10(17(13,14)15)8-4-3-7-12-11(8)9/h3-7H,2H2,1H3,(H,13,14,15) Key: YAMVZYRZAMBCED-UHFFFAOYSA-N; InChI=1/C11H11NO4S/c1-2-16-9-5-6-10(17(13,14)15)8-4-3-7-12-11(8)9/h3-7H,2H2,1H3,(H,13,14,15) Key: YAMVZYRZAMBCED-UHFFFAOYAL
- SMILES: CCOC1=C2C(=C(C=C1)S(=O)(=O)O)C=CC=N2

Properties
Chemical formula	C_{11}H_{11}NO_{4}S
Molar mass	253.27 g·mol^{−1}
- Except where otherwise noted, data are given for materials in their standard state (at 25 °C [77 °F], 100 kPa). Infobox references

Actinoquinol is a chemical compound that absorbs UVB radiation. In a rabbit-cornea study, eye drops combining actinoquinol with hyaluronic acid reduced changes in corneal optics and suppressed oxidative damage after UVB irradiation, although the protective effect was limited to the lower UVB dose tested.
