= Acridorex =

Amphetamine

Clinical data
- ATC code: None

Identifiers
- IUPAC name: N-[2-(9-acridinyl)ethyl]-1-phenyl-2-propanamine
- CAS Number: 47487-22-9
- PubChem CID: 297931
- ChemSpider: 263084
- UNII: 7SGV5HQH8B
- CompTox Dashboard (EPA): DTXSID30866131

Chemical and physical data
- Formula: C_{24}H_{24}N_{2}
- Molar mass: 340.470 g·mol^{−1}
- 3D model (JSmol): Interactive image
- SMILES: CC(Cc1ccccc1)NCCc2c3ccccc3nc4c2cccc4
- InChI: InChI=1S/C24H24N2/c1-18(17-19-9-3-2-4-10-19)25-16-15-20-21-11-5-7-13-23(21)26-24-14-8-6-12-22(20)24/h2-14,18,25H,15-17H2,1H3; Key:SZSWKYIWACGNDZ-UHFFFAOYSA-N

Acridorex (INN; BS 7573a) is an amphetamine which was investigated as an anorectic but does not appear to have ever been marketed.
