= Ablukast =

Chemical compound

Clinical data
- ATC code: none

Legal status
- Legal status: Investigational

Identifiers
- IUPAC name: 6-acetyl-7-[5-(4-acetyl-3-hydroxy-2-propylphenoxy)pentoxy]chroman-2-carboxylic acid
- CAS Number: 96566-25-5
- PubChem CID: 57109
- ChemSpider: 51496
- UNII: 000TKM5BBQ
- KEGG: D02739
- ChEMBL: ChEMBL22016
- CompTox Dashboard (EPA): DTXSID20869277

Chemical and physical data
- Formula: C_{28}H_{34}O_{8}
- Molar mass: 498.572 g·mol^{−1}
- 3D model (JSmol): Interactive image
- SMILES: CCCC1=C(C=CC(=C1O)C(=O)C)OCCCCCOC2=CC3=C(CCC(O3)C(=O)O)C=C2C(=O)C
- InChI: InChI=1S/C28H34O8/c1-4-8-21-23(12-10-20(17(2)29)27(21)31)34-13-6-5-7-14-35-26-16-25-19(15-22(26)18(3)30)9-11-24(36-25)28(32)33/h10,12,15-16,24,31H,4-9,11,13-14H2,1-3H3,(H,32,33); Key:FGGYJWZYDAROFF-UHFFFAOYSA-N

Ablukast (INN) is an experimental drug that is a leukotriene antagonist. It was investigated for potential applications in the treatment of inflammatory conditions, including asthma, skin disorders, and inflammatory bowel disease. It reached Phase III clinical trials, but development was discontinued in 1996.
