= Abagovomab =

Chemical compound

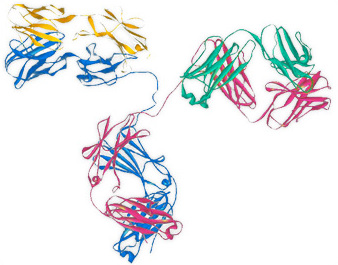

Monoclonal antibody
- Type: Whole antibody
- Source: Mouse
- Target: (imitates CA-125)

Clinical data
- Pregnancy category: N/A
- Routes of administration: subcutaneous
- ATC code: none

Pharmacokinetic data
- Bioavailability: N/A
- Excretion: N/A

Identifiers
- CAS Number: 792921-10-9
- ChemSpider: none
- UNII: 3YK0326U7X

Abagovomab is an investigational new drug that is being developed by the pharmaceutical company Menarini for the treatment of ovarian cancer.

Abagovomab is a mouse anti-idiotype monoclonal antibody whose variable epitope mimics the tumour-associated antigen CA-125, which is highly expressed in epithelial ovarian cancer. Unlike antibodies that directly target CA-125, abagovomab acts as a "surrogate" antigen. By mimicking CA-125, it prompts the immune system to recognize and attack tumour cells expressing this protein. It is hoped that this immune response will eliminate residual tumour cells and help prevent disease recurrence.

== Mechanism of action ==
Abagovomab was engineered to mimic the tumor-associated antigen CA-125, which is highly expressed in over 80% of epithelial ovarian cancers. It was generated by immunizing mice with the OC125 antibody, leading to the production of anti-idiotypic antibodies (Ab2) that structurally resemble CA-125. Administration of abagovomab stimulates the patient’s immune system to produce anti-anti-idiotypic antibodies (Ab3), which can recognize and potentially target CA-125-expressing tumor cells[3][8] (PMID 21241213, PMC5795662).

== Development ==
=== Preclinical and early clinical studies ===
Preclinical studies confirmed that abagovomab induced both humoral and cellular immune responses against CA-125. Early phase I and Ib/II clinical studies primarily assessed safety and immunogenicity, demonstrating that abagovomab was well tolerated, with most adverse events being mild and self-limited, such as local injection site reactions and mild systemic symptoms. A strong Ab3 antibody response was observed in a significant proportion of patients, and this response was associated with prolonged overall survival.

Subsequent phase I trials explored different doses and routes of administration (intramuscular vs. subcutaneous) to optimize immunogenicity and safety. Both routes and doses were safe, and robust Ab3 responses were observed across all groups. The subcutaneous route was ultimately favored for ease of administration.

=== Phase III trials ===
Encouraged by early data, the pivotal phase III MIMOSA (Monoclonal antibody Immunotherapy for Malignancies of Ovary by Subcutaneous Abagovomab) trial was launched. This large, double-blind, placebo-controlled study enrolled patients with epithelial ovarian cancer who had achieved complete clinical remission after standard treatment, administering abagovomab subcutaneously in an induction and maintenance schedule for up to 21 months. Despite the strong immunogenicity the MIMOSA trial failed to show a statistically significant improvement in recurrence-free or overall survival compared to placebo. The hazard ratios for recurrence-free and overall survival indicated no meaningful difference between the abagovomab and placebo groups. Consequently, the development of abagovomab for ovarian cancer was discontinued, and the phase III program was terminated in both the US and EU by 2015.

== Ovarian cancer ==
Ovarian cancer is the most malignant tumour of the female reproductive organs. After endometrial cancer, it is the second most common genital tumour in women with c. 9,000 women newly affected each year and, because of its aggressiveness, it has the highest mortality rate. This is due in part to the fact that there is no screening examination for early detection, and that the disease is therefore usually only discovered at an advanced stage, and in part to the tumour's tendency, although responding well to initial treatment, to recur again later.

In spite of initially successful treatment with surgery and chemotherapy, which forces back the tumour "completely", i.e. into no longer visible residues, there is a relapse of the disease (recurrence) in more than half the women affected. Today, no further therapy would be conducted in this situation as long as the disease did not occur again, i.e. clinical monitoring of the symptom-free patients as part of follow-up care is the current standard procedure. In this time-window of the patient's history so called ‘watch and wait’ abagovomab is potentially capable of deferring or even preventing the occurrence of the relapse.
