= Abafungin =

Chemical compound

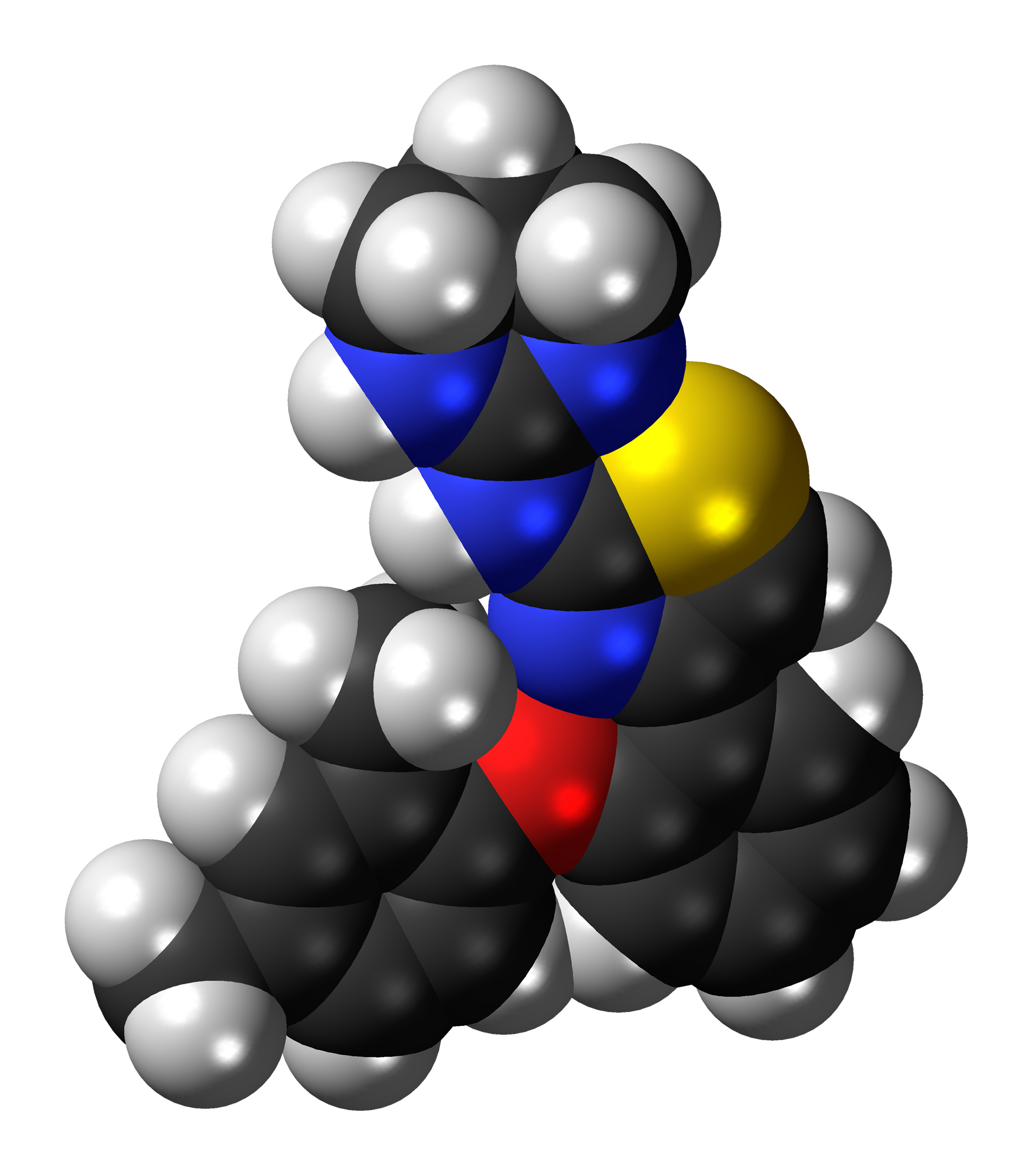

Clinical data
- Trade names: Abasol
- Routes of administration: Topical (cream)
- ATC code: none

Identifiers
- IUPAC name: N-[4-[2-(2,4-dimethylphenoxy)phenyl]-1,3-thiazol-2-yl]-1,4,5,6-tetrahydropyrimidin-2-amine
- CAS Number: 129639-79-8
- PubChem CID: 159326
- DrugBank: DB06395
- ChemSpider: 140124
- UNII: 11DI31LWXF
- ChEBI: CHEBI:76005
- CompTox Dashboard (EPA): DTXSID60869776
- ECHA InfoCard: 100.125.129

Chemical and physical data
- Formula: C_{21}H_{22}N_{4}OS
- Molar mass: 378.49 g·mol^{−1}
- 3D model (JSmol): Interactive image
- SMILES: CC1=CC(=C(C=C1)OC2=CC=CC=C2C3=CSC(=N3)NC4=NCCCN4)C
- InChI: InChI=1S/C21H22N4OS/c1-14-8-9-18(15(2)12-14)26-19-7-4-3-6-16(19)17-13-27-21(24-17)25-20-22-10-5-11-23-20/h3-4,6-9,12-13H,5,10-11H2,1-2H3,(H2,22,23,24,25); Key:TYBHXIFFPVFXQW-UHFFFAOYSA-N

Abafungin (INN) is a broad-spectrum arylguanidines-class antifungal agent with a novel mechanism of action for the treatment of dermatomycoses. Abasol is a topical cream formulation of abafungin by York Pharma.

== History ==
Abafungin was first synthesized at Bayer AG, Leverkusen, Germany. A study of H_{2}-antagonists related to famotidine, resulted in the discovery of its antifungal properties. Its development seems to have been discontinued in 2009.

== Mechanism of action ==
Unlike imidazole- and triazole-class antifungals, abafungin directly impairs the fungal cell membrane. In addition, abafungin inhibits the enzyme sterol 24-C-methyltransferase, modifying the composition of the fungal membrane. Abafungin has antibiotic activity against gram-positive bacteria as well as sporicidal activity.
