= Aconiazide =

Names
- IUPAC name 2-[2-[(E)-(Pyridine-4-carbonylhydrazinylidene)methyl]phenoxy]acetic acid
- Other names Isonicophen; Phenoxalid

Identifiers
CAS Number	13410-86-1
3D model (JSmol)	Interactive image
ChEMBL	ChEMBL1590674
ChemSpider	4938702
PubChem CID	6433573
UNII	8OKQ9NS8MO
CompTox Dashboard (EPA)	DTXSID8046292
- InChI: InChI=1S/C15H13N3O4/c19-14(20)10-22-13-4-2-1-3-12(13)9-17-18-15(21)11-5-7-16-8-6-11/h1-9H,10H2,(H,18,21)(H,19,20)/b17-9+ Key: MDFXJBQEWLCGHP-RQZCQDPDSA-N; InChI=1/C15H13N3O4/c19-14(20)10-22-13-4-2-1-3-12(13)9-17-18-15(21)11-5-7-16-8-6-11/h1-9H,10H2,(H,18,21)(H,19,20)/b17-9+ Key: MDFXJBQEWLCGHP-RQZCQDPDBX
- SMILES: C1=CC=C(C(=C1)/C=N/NC(=O)C2=CC=NC=C2)OCC(=O)O

Properties
Chemical formula	C_{15}H_{13}N_{3}O_{4}
Molar mass	299.286 g·mol^{−1}
- Except where otherwise noted, data are given for materials in their standard state (at 25 °C [77 °F], 100 kPa). Infobox references

Aconiazide is an anti-tuberculosis medication. It is a prodrug of isoniazide that was developed and studied for its lower toxicity, but it does not appear to be marketed anywhere in the world in 2021.
