= Abitesartan =

Chemical compound

Clinical data
- ATC code: none

Identifiers
- IUPAC name: 1-([pentanoyl-([4-[2-(2H-tetrazol-5-yl)phenyl]phenyl]methyl)amino]methyl)cyclopentane-1-carboxylic acid
- CAS Number: 137882-98-5
- PubChem CID: 176863
- ChemSpider: 154037
- UNII: 3YY13B9G25
- ChEMBL: ChEMBL1742401
- CompTox Dashboard (EPA): DTXSID50160360

Chemical and physical data
- Formula: C_{26}H_{31}N_{5}O_{3}
- Molar mass: 461.566 g·mol^{−1}
- 3D model (JSmol): Interactive image
- SMILES: CCCCC(=O)N(CC1=CC=C(C=C1)C2=CC=CC=C2C3=NNN=N3)CC4(CCCC4)C(=O)O
- InChI: InChI=1S/C26H31N5O3/c1-2-3-10-23(32)31(18-26(25(33)34)15-6-7-16-26)17-19-11-13-20(14-12-19)21-8-4-5-9-22(21)24-27-29-30-28-24/h4-5,8-9,11-14H,2-3,6-7,10,15-18H2,1H3,(H,33,34)(H,27,28,29,30); Key:ZUMPSVPHCDJCMD-UHFFFAOYSA-N

Abitesartan (INN) is an Angiotensin II receptor antagonist.
