= Abunidazole =

- Partially condensed, Kekulé, skeletal formula of abunidazole

Names
- IUPAC name 4-tert-Butyl-2-[hydroxy-(1-methyl-5-nitroimidazol-2-yl)methyl]phenol

Identifiers
CAS Number	91017-58-2
3D model (JSmol)	Interactive image
ChEMBL	ChEMBL301926
ChemSpider	148962
PubChem CID	170365
UNII	6EH821150I
CompTox Dashboard (EPA)	DTXSID60869074
- InChI: InChI=1S/C15H19N3O4/c1-15(2,3)9-5-6-11(19)10(7-9)13(20)14-16-8-12(17(14)4)18(21)22/h5-8,13,19-20H,1-4H3 Key: DBOZSKOENGSGEJ-UHFFFAOYSA-N; InChI=1/C15H19N3O4/c1-15(2,3)9-5-6-11(19)10(7-9)13(20)14-16-8-12(17(14)4)18(21)22/h5-8,13,19-20H,1-4H3 Key: DBOZSKOENGSGEJ-UHFFFAOYAQ
- SMILES: Cn1c(N(=O)=O)cnc1C(O)c2cc(C(C)(C)C)ccc2O

Properties
Chemical formula	C_{15}H_{19}N_{3}O_{4}
Molar mass	305.334 g·mol^{−1}
Density	1.303 g/mL
log P	2.815
Acidity (pK_{a})	9.567
Basicity (pK_{b})	4.430
- Except where otherwise noted, data are given for materials in their standard state (at 25 °C [77 °F], 100 kPa). verify (what is ?) Infobox references

Abunidazole (INN) is a nitroimidazole antifungal medication. It was named in 1984 but apparently never marketed.
