= Valeriana glechomifolia =

Scientific classification
- Kingdom: Plantae
- Clade: Tracheophytes
- Clade: Angiosperms
- Clade: Eudicots
- Clade: Asterids
- Order: Dipsacales
- Family: Caprifoliaceae
- Genus: Valeriana
- Species: V. glechomifolia

Binomial name
- Valeriana glechomifolia F.G.Mey.

Species of plant

Valeriana glechomifolia is a species of flowering plant in the family Caprifoliaceae. It is endemic to the state of Rio Grande do Sul in southern Brazil.
