= Acebrochol =

Chemical compound

Clinical data
- ATC code: none

Identifiers
- IUPAC name: [(4S,6R,8S,9S,10R,13R,14S,17R)-4,6-dibromo-10,13-dimethyl-17-[(2R)-6-methylheptan-2-yl]-2,3,4,5,6,7,8,9,11,12,14,15,16,17-tetradecahydro-1H-cyclopenta[a]phenanthren-3-yl] acetate
- CAS Number: 514-50-1
- PubChem CID: 10952056
- ChemSpider: 9127276
- UNII: 7XZB016MY5
- ChEMBL: ChEMBL2104033

Chemical and physical data
- Formula: C_{29}H_{48}Br_{2}O_{2}
- Molar mass: 588.509 g·mol^{−1}
- 3D model (JSmol): Interactive image
- SMILES: C[C@H](CCCC(C)C)[C@H]1CC[C@@H]2[C@@]1(CC[C@H]3[C@H]2C[C@H]([C@@]4([C@@]3(CC[C@@H](C4)OC(=O)C)C)Br)Br)C
- InChI: InChI=1S/C29H48Br2O2/c1-18(2)8-7-9-19(3)23-10-11-24-22-16-26(30)29(31)17-21(33-20(4)32)12-15-28(29,6)25(22)13-14-27(23,24)5/h18-19,21-26H,7-17H2,1-6H3/t19-,21+,22+,23-,24+,25+,26-,27-,28-,29+/m1/s1; Key:ISLUIHYFJMYECW-BSMCXZHXSA-N

Acebrochol (INN), also known as cholesteryl acetate dibromide or 5α,6β-dibromocholestan-3β-ol acetate, is a neuroactive steroid which was described as a sedative and hypnotic but was never marketed.

== See also ==
- Allopregnanolone
- Ganaxolone
- Hydroxydione
- Progesterone
