= Actarit =

Chemical compound

Clinical data
- AHFS/Drugs.com: International Drug Names
- ATC code: None

Identifiers
- IUPAC name: (4-Acetamidophenyl)acetic acid
- CAS Number: 18699-02-0
- PubChem CID: 2018
- ChemSpider: 1941
- UNII: HW5B6351RZ
- KEGG: D01395
- ChEMBL: ChEMBL1226203
- CompTox Dashboard (EPA): DTXSID0020020
- ECHA InfoCard: 100.038.631

Chemical and physical data
- Formula: C_{10}H_{11}NO_{3}
- Molar mass: 193.202 g·mol^{−1}
- 3D model (JSmol): Interactive image
- SMILES: O=C(O)Cc1ccc(cc1)NC(=O)C
- InChI: InChI=1S/C10H11NO3/c1-7(12)11-9-4-2-8(3-5-9)6-10(13)14/h2-5H,6H2,1H3,(H,11,12)(H,13,14); Key:MROJXXOCABQVEF-UHFFFAOYSA-N

Actarit is a disease-modifying antirheumatic drug (DMARD) developed in Japan for use in rheumatoid arthritis.
