= Aceprometazine =

Chemical compound

Clinical data
- Pregnancy category: Contraindicated Passes into breast milk
- Routes of administration: Oral
- ATC code: none

Legal status
- Legal status: In general: ℞ (Prescription only)

Pharmacokinetic data
- Metabolism: Hepatic
- Excretion: Renal and fecal

Identifiers
- IUPAC name: 1-{10-[2-(dimethylamino)propyl]-10H-phenothiazin-2-yl}ethanone
- CAS Number: 13461-01-3
- PubChem CID: 26035
- DrugBank: DB01615
- ChemSpider: 24249
- UNII: 984N9YTM4Y
- ChEBI: CHEBI:53770
- ChEMBL: ChEMBL2104054
- CompTox Dashboard (EPA): DTXSID00864407
- ECHA InfoCard: 100.033.315

Chemical and physical data
- Formula: C_{19}H_{22}N_{2}OS
- Molar mass: 326.46 g·mol^{−1}
- 3D model (JSmol): Interactive image
- SMILES: O=C(c2cc1N(c3c(Sc1cc2)cccc3)CC(N(C)C)C)C
- InChI: InChI=1S/C19H22N2OS/c1-13(20(3)4)12-21-16-7-5-6-8-18(16)23-19-10-9-15(14(2)22)11-17(19)21/h5-11,13H,12H2,1-4H3; Key:XLOQNFNTQIRSOX-UHFFFAOYSA-N

Aceprometazine (INN) is a phenothiazine derivative prescription drug with neuroleptic and anti-histamine properties It is not widely prescribed, and may be associated with drug-induced Parkinsonism. It may be used in combination with meprobamate for the treatment of sleep disorders. This combination is available in France under the trade name Mepronizine.

It is structurally related to the phenothiazine derivative veterinary drug acepromazine.

== Synthesis ==
Note: The reason for the rearrangement in the sidechain between the precursor and the product are on account of a methadone-type aziridine.

Patent Ex 6:

2-Acetylphenothiazine [6631-94-3] (1) 2-Chloropropyldimethylamine [108-14-5] (2)
