= Acedapsone =

Antimicrobial drug

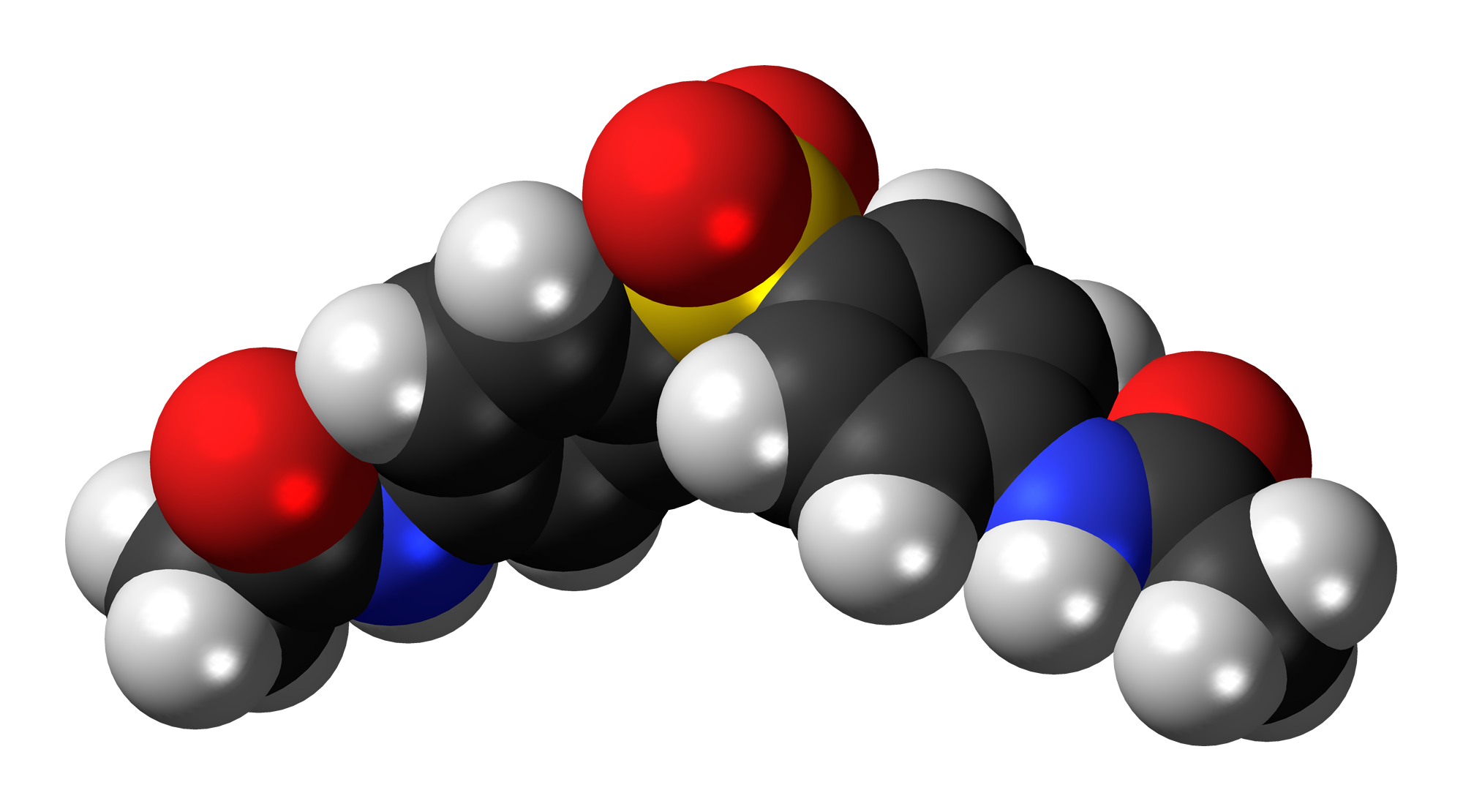

Clinical data
- Trade names: Rodilone; Hansolar
- ATC code: none

Identifiers
- IUPAC name: N-[4-(4-acetamidophenyl)sulfonylphenyl]acetamide
- CAS Number: 77-46-3
- PubChem CID: 6477
- ChemSpider: 6232
- UNII: 0GZ72U84TN
- KEGG: D02751
- ChEMBL: ChEMBL154166
- CompTox Dashboard (EPA): DTXSID1021295
- ECHA InfoCard: 100.000.936

Chemical and physical data
- Formula: C_{16}H_{16}N_{2}O_{4}S
- Molar mass: 332.37 g·mol^{−1}
- 3D model (JSmol): Interactive image
- Melting point: 290 °C (554 °F)
- SMILES: CC(=O)NC1=CC=C(C=C1)S(=O)(=O)C2=CC=C(C=C2)NC(=O)C
- InChI: InChI=1S/C16H16N2O4S/c1-11(19)17-13-3-7-15(8-4-13)23(21,22)16-9-5-14(6-10-16)18-12(2)20/h3-10H,1-2H3,(H,17,19)(H,18,20); Key:AMTPYFGPPVFBBI-UHFFFAOYSA-N

Acedapsone (INN) is an antimicrobial drug, which also has antimalarial activity.

Acedapsone is the INN for diacetyldapsone. It was synthesized and developed in 1937 by Ernest Fourneau and his team in the pharmaceutical chemistry laboratory of Pasteur Institute, and it was marketed as Rodilone by the Rhône-Poulenc company.

It is a long-acting prodrug of dapsone. It is used for treating leprosy.

It crystallises as pale yellow needles from diethyl ether, and as leaflets from dilute ethanol. It is slightly soluble in water.

== Synthesis ==
Acedapsone synthesis:

Acedapsone is conveniently prepared by acetylation of dapsone.
