= Acetyldigitoxin =

Pharmaceutical drug

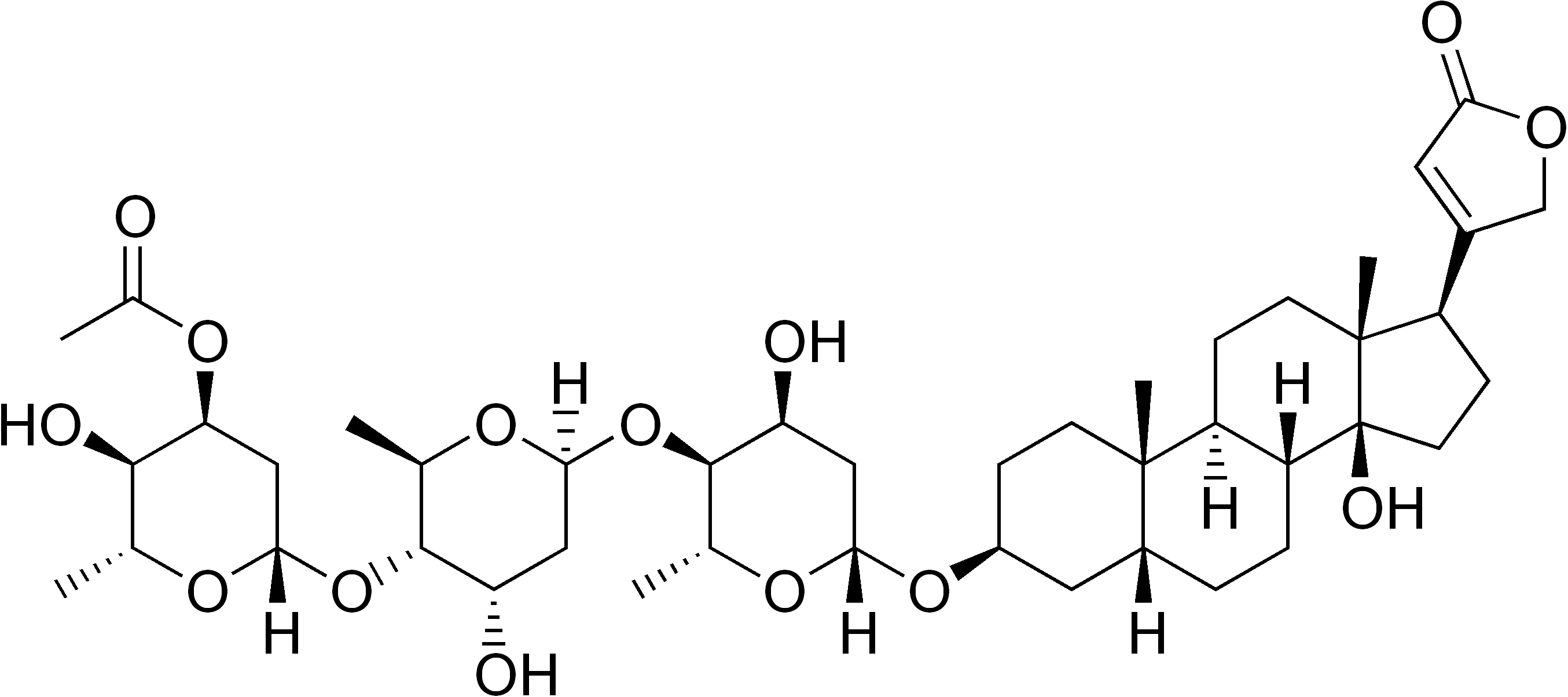

Clinical data
- ATC code: C01AA01 (WHO)

Legal status
- Legal status: AU: S4 (Prescription only)

Identifiers
- IUPAC name: [(2R,3R,4S,6S)-3-Hydroxy-6-[(2R,4S,6S)-4-hydroxy-6-[(2R,3S,4S,6R)-4-hydroxy-6-[ [(5R,8R,9S,10S,13R,14S,17R')-14-hydroxy-10,13-dimethyl-17-(5-oxo-2H-furan-3-yl)-1,2,3,4,5,6,7,8,9,11,12,15,16,17-tetradecahydrocyclopenta[a]phenanthren-3-yl]oxy]-2-methyloxan-3-yl]oxy-2-methyloxan-3-yl]oxy-2-methyloxan-4-yl] acetate
- CAS Number: 1111-39-3
- PubChem CID: 68949
- DrugBank: DB00511
- ChemSpider: 4447572
- UNII: 0ZV4Q4L2FU
- KEGG: D06881
- ChEBI: CHEBI:53773
- ChEMBL: ChEMBL1200634
- CompTox Dashboard (EPA): DTXSID6022551
- ECHA InfoCard: 100.042.660

Chemical and physical data
- Formula: C_{43}H_{66}O_{14}
- Molar mass: 806.987 g·mol^{−1}
- 3D model (JSmol): Interactive image
- SMILES: O=C\1OC/C(=C/1)[C@H]2CC[C@@]8(O)[C@]2(C)CC[C@H]7[C@H]8CC[C@H]6[C@]7(C)CC[C@H](O[C@@H]5O[C@@H]([C@@H](O[C@@H]4O[C@@H]([C@@H](O[C@@H]3O[C@H](C)[C@@H](O)[C@@H](OC(=O)C)C3)[C@@H](O)C4)C)[C@@H](O)C5)C)C6
- InChI: InChI=1S/C43H66O14/c1-21-38(48)33(54-24(4)44)19-37(51-21)57-40-23(3)53-36(18-32(40)46)56-39-22(2)52-35(17-31(39)45)55-27-9-12-41(5)26(16-27)7-8-30-29(41)10-13-42(6)28(11-14-43(30,42)49)25-15-34(47)50-20-25/h15,21-23,26-33,35-40,45-46,48-49H,7-14,16-20H2,1-6H3/t21-,22-,23-,26-,27+,28-,29+,30-,31+,32+,33+,35+,36+,37+,38-,39-,40-,41+,42-,43+/m1/s1; Key:HPMZBILYSWLILX-UMDUKNJSSA-N

Acetyldigitoxin is a cardiac glycoside. It is an acetyl derivative of digitoxin, found in the leaves of Digitalis species. It is used to treat cardiac failure, particularly that associated with tachycardia.
