= Acequinoline =

Identifiers
- IUPAC name: 1-(7-methoxy-2,4-dimethylquinolin-3-yl)ethanone
- CAS Number: 42465-20-3
- PubChem CID: 170370
- DrugBank: DB20678
- ChemSpider: 148966
- UNII: FKJ64U4XOB
- ChEBI: CHEBI:750592
- ChEMBL: ChEMBL2104051

Chemical and physical data
- Formula: C_{14}H_{15}NO_{2}
- Molar mass: 229.279 g·mol^{−1}
- 3D model (JSmol): Interactive image
- SMILES: CC1=C2C=CC(=CC2=NC(=C1C(=O)C)C)OC
- InChI: InChI=1S/C14H15NO2/c1-8-12-6-5-11(17-4)7-13(12)15-9(2)14(8)10(3)16/h5-7H,1-4H3; Key:JKZQRPQTPLGSDW-UHFFFAOYSA-N

Acequinoline is a synthetic derivative of quinoline. It is an analgesic and anti-inflammatory agent. It additionally has antirheumatic and antimalarial properties.
