= Acefylline =

Chemical compound

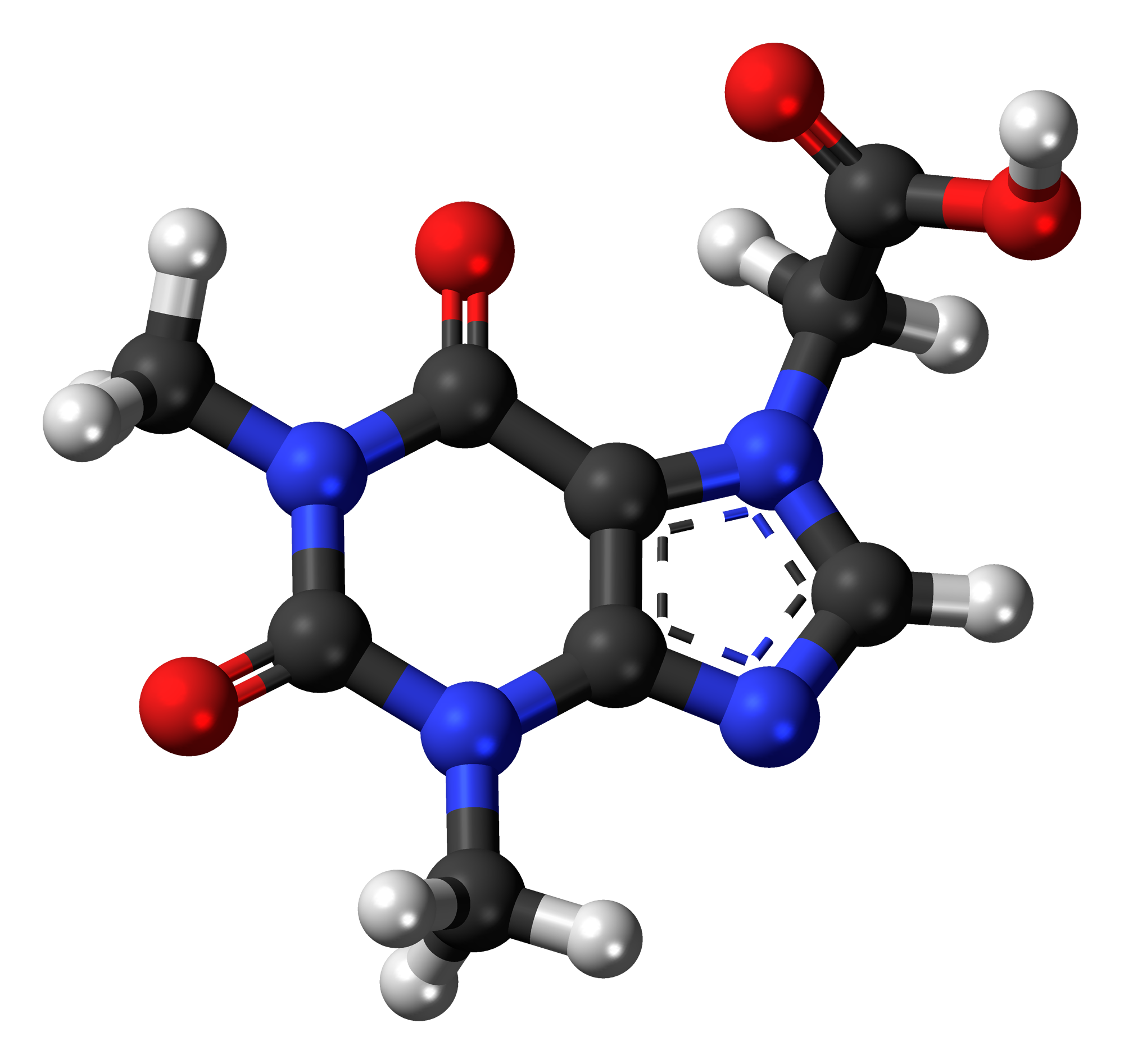

Clinical data
- Routes of administration: Intramuscular, Intravenous
- ATC code: R03DA09 (WHO) (acefylline piperazine)

Identifiers
- IUPAC name: (1,3-Dimethyl-2,6-dioxo-1,2,3,6-tetrahydro-7H-purin-7-yl)acetic acid
- CAS Number: 652-37-9
- PubChem CID: 69550
- ChemSpider: 62754
- UNII: M494UE2YEP
- ChEMBL: ChEMBL70246
- CompTox Dashboard (EPA): DTXSID6057796
- ECHA InfoCard: 100.010.447

Chemical and physical data
- Formula: C_{9}H_{10}N_{4}O_{4}
- Molar mass: 238.203 g·mol^{−1}
- 3D model (JSmol): Interactive image
- SMILES: O=C2N(c1ncn(c1C(=O)N2C)CC(=O)O)C
- InChI: InChI=1S/C9H10N4O4/c1-11-7-6(8(16)12(2)9(11)17)13(4-10-7)3-5(14)15/h4H,3H2,1-2H3,(H,14,15); Key:HCYFGRCYSCXKNQ-UHFFFAOYSA-N

Acefylline (INN), also known as 7-theophyllineacetic acid, is a stimulant drug of the xanthine chemical class. It acts as an adenosine receptor antagonist. It is combined with diphenhydramine in the pharmaceutical preparation etanautine to help offset diphenhydramine induced drowsiness.

A silanol–mannuronic acid conjugate of acefylline, acefylline methylsilanol mannuronate (INCI; trade name Xantalgosil C) is marketed as a lipolytic phosphodiesterase inhibitor. It is used as an ingredient in cosmeceuticals for the treatment of cellulite and as a skin conditioner.

== See also ==
- 8-Chlorotheophylline
- Theophylline
- Caffeine
