= Gap junction protein =

In biology, gap junction proteins are proteins that form gap junctions, which connect two neighboring cells. They are divided into two broad categories: pannexins and connexins.

== Overview ==
Gap junction proteins are present in many organisms, including all vertebrates, as well as chordates, tunicates, ascidians, and appendicularians. Connexins were discovered first; the gap junction proteins of non-chordates (or innexins) were discovered later, and the proteins of chordates even later. Pannexins are typically between 300 and 600 amino acids long. By the standards of other proteins, gap junction proteins have very short turnover times and very flexible gene expression patterns.

== List ==
=== Gap junction α (GJA) proteins ===
- GJA1, Cx43, gap junction alpha-1 protein
- GJA2, Cx38, gap junction alpha-2 protein
- GJA3, Cx46, gap junction alpha-3 protein
- GJA4, Cx37, gap junction alpha-4 protein
- GJA5, Cx40, gap junction alpha-5 protein
- GJA6, Cx33 gap junction alpha-6 protein
- GJA7, Cx44.3-45.6, gap junction alpha-7 protein
- GJA8, Cx50, gap junction alpha-8 protein
- GJA9, Cx58, gap junction alpha-9 protein
- GJA10, Cx62, gap junction alpha-10 protein
- GJA11, Cx59, gap junction alpha-11 protein
- GJA12, Cx46.6, gap junction alpha-12 protein

=== Gap junction β (GJB) proteins ===
- GJB1, Cx32, gap junction beta-1 protein
- GJB2, Cx26, gap junction beta-2 protein
- GJB3, Cx31, gap junction beta-3 protein
- GJB4, Cx30.3, gap junction beta-4 protein
- GJB5, Cx31.1, gap junction beta-5 protein
- GJB6, Cx30, gap junction beta-6 protein
- GJB7, Cx25, gap junction beta-7 protein

=== Gap junction γ (GJC) proteins ===
- GJC1, Cx45.6, gap junction gamma-1 protein
- GJC2, Cx47, gap junction gamma-2 protein
- GJC3, Cx29, gap junction gamma-3 protein

=== Gap junction δ (GJD) proteins ===
- GJD1, Cx29, gap junction delta-1 protein
- GJD2, Cx36, gap junction delta-2 protein
- GJD3, Cx31.9, gap junction delta-3 protein
- GJD4, Cx40.1, gap junction delta-4 protein

=== Gap junction ε (GJE) proteins ===
- GJE1, Cx23, gap junction epsilon-1 protein

== See also ==
- Tight junction protein
