= Juxtacrine signalling =

Contact-based cell-cell signalling

Notch-mediated juxtacrine signal between adjacent cells

In biology, juxtacrine signalling (or contact-dependent signalling) is a type of cell–cell or cell–extracellular matrix signalling in multicellular organisms that requires close contact. In this type of signalling, a ligand on one surface binds to a receptor on another adjacent surface. Hence, this stands in contrast to releasing a signaling molecule by diffusion into extracellular space, the use of long-range conduits like membrane nanotubes and cytonemes (akin to 'bridges') or the use of extracellular vesicles like exosomes or microvesicles (akin to 'boats'). There are three types of juxtracrine signaling:

1. A membrane-bound ligand (protein, oligosaccharide, lipid) and a membrane protein of two adjacent cells interact.
2. A communicating junction links the intracellular compartments of two adjacent cells, allowing transit of relatively small molecules.
3. An extracellular matrix glycoprotein and a membrane protein interact.

Additionally, in unicellular organisms such as bacteria, juxtracrine signaling refers to interactions by membrane contact.

Juxtracrine signaling has been observed for some growth factors, cytokine and chemokine cellular signals, playing an important role in the immune response. Juxtracrine signaling is also involved in cell specification, or determination of a cell fate determination through a process called induction. In this process, the inducing cells send a signal to responder cells that receive the signal to activate the process of responder's cell fate determination. This cell-to-cell communication plays a role in many developmental processes, such as patterning of the embryos, establishing of cell type diversity, organogenesis, and formation of tissues in various organisms. It has a critical role in development, particularly of cardiac and neural function.

Other types of cell signaling include paracrine signalling and autocrine signalling. Paracrine signaling occurs over short distances, while autocrine signaling involves a cell responding to its own paracrine factors.

The term "juxtracrine" was originally introduced by Anklesaria et al. (1990) to describe a possible way of signal transduction between TGF alpha and EGFR.

== Cell–cell signaling ==
In this type of signaling, specific membrane-bound ligands bind to a cell's membrane. A cell with the appropriate cell surface receptor or cell adhesion molecule can bind to it. Cell-cell signaling can be extrinsic and intrinsic to the cells. Intrinsic signaling indicates that cells connect more directly with the help of cadherins, ephrins, and Notch-Delta signaling pathway, thus, more intrinsically with the cell defined machinery. Juxtracrine signaling is considered an intrinsic cell-to-cell signaling as cells communicate through surface level proteins. External cell-cell signaling involves bringing out information in or out of the cell without any direct contact with cell structures, except the binding sites for the signaling molecules. Such cell-cell signaling is utilized by the paracrine and autocrine signaling.

Some of the cell signaling pathways that are involved in cell-to-cell communication include: Notch-Delta, FGF, Wnt, EGF, TGF-beta, Hedgehog, Hippo, Jun kinase, Nf-kB, and retinoic acid receptor. Of all these pathways, juxtracrine signaling utilizes Notch and Hippo the most as they involve a more direct cell-to-cell contact signaling.

Notch signaling pathway, notably involved in neural development. In the Notch signaling pathway for vertebrates and Drosophila, the receiving cell is told not to become neural through the binding of Delta and Notch. Within the eye of vertebrates, which cells become optic neurons and which become glial cells is regulated by Notch and its ligands.

Some cells, like ephrin-Eph, are only able to communicate through juxtacrine signaling. Eph ligands can only activate receptors when bound to a membrane. This is because a high density of the Eph ligand is necessary for the receptor to bind to it. Ephrin-Eph is used for axon guidance, angiogenesis, and epithelial and neuronal cell migration.

== Communicating junctions ==
Two adjacent cells can construct communicating conduits between their intracellular compartments: gap junctions in animals and plasmodesmata in plants.

Gap junctions act as communication channels between adjacent cells. They are made of connexins in vertebrates and innexins in invertebrates. They connect the cytoplasm of cells and exchange ions and messenger signals. Electrical synapses are electrically conductive gap junctions between neurons. Gap junctions are critical for cardiac myocytes; mice and humans deficient in a particular gap junction protein have severe heart development defects.

Plasmodesmata in plants are cytoplasmic strands that pass through cell walls and facilitate connections with adjacent cells. Plasmodesmata are highly dynamic in both strucutural modifications and biogenesis. They are able to organize cells in domains, serving as basic developmental units for plants, as well as mediate the intracellular movement of a variety of proteins and nucleic acids.

== Cell–extracellular matrix signaling ==
The extracellular matrix is composed of glycoproteins (proteins and mucopolysaccharides (glycosaminoglycan)) produced by the organism's cells. They are secreted not only to build a supportive structure but also to provide critical information on the immediate environment to nearby cells. One of the main general adhesive molecules in the ECM is fibronectin; this glycoprotein dimer links cells to each other and other noncellular materials. It also plays an important role in cell migration as it provides a surface for migrating cells. Other examples of molecules include collagens and vitronectin. Also, the cells can themselves interact by contact with extracellular matrix molecules and as such, this can be considered an indirect cell / cell communication. Cells use mainly the receptor integrin to interact with ECM proteins. Integrins are a family of receptor proteins that integrate the extracellular and intracellular structures, allowing them to perform together. The tails of integrins tend to cluster as they bind with the ECM, stabilizing and strengthening the signaling pathway. This signaling can influence the cell cycle and cellular differentiation by directing which cells live or die, which cells proliferate, or which cells are able to exit the cell cycle and differentiate. Cellular differentiation involves a cell changing its phenotypical or functional type. Integrins are one of the major regulators of the cell's function.

== See also ==
- Cell adhesion, mechanical adhesion between cells and/or the extracellular matrix
- Role of cell adhesions in neural development
- Cell adhesion molecules
- Pannexin, vertebrate proteins used to form conduits between the intracellular and extracellular space
- Autocrine signalling
- Paracrine signalling
- Endocrine system
