= Connexin =

Protein family

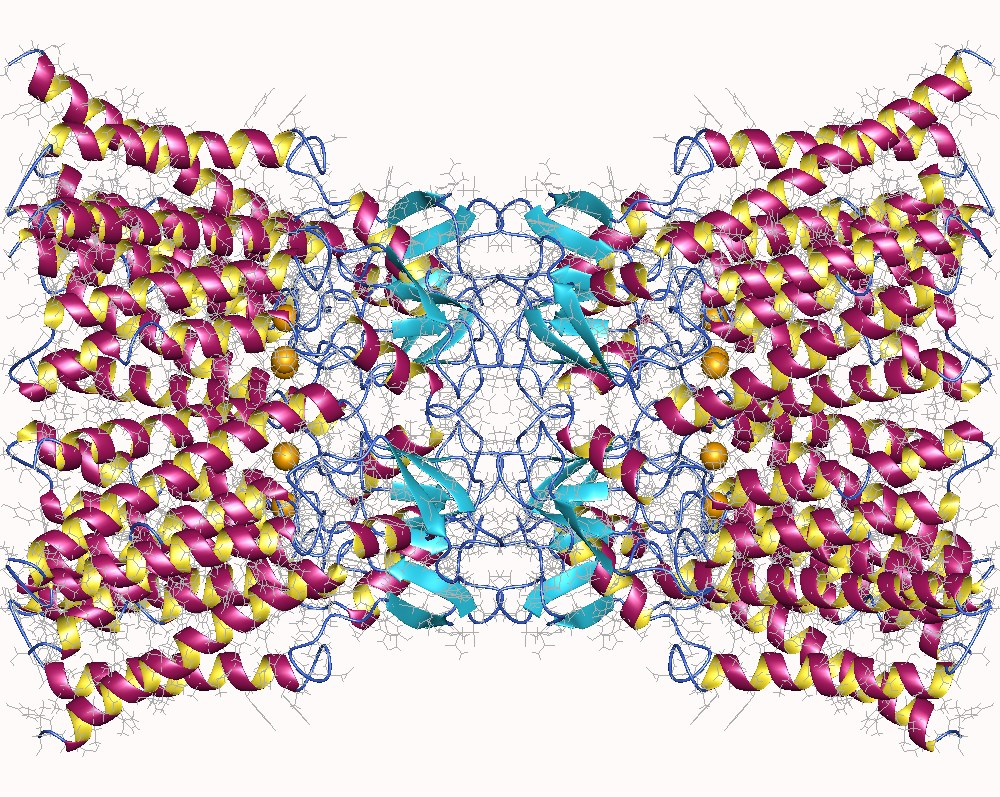
- Connexin-26 dodecamer. A gap junction, composed of twelve identical connexin proteins, six in the membrane of each cell. Each of these six units is a single polypeptide which passes the membrane four times (referred to as four-pass transmembrane proteins).

Identifiers
- Symbol: Connexin
- Pfam: PF00029
- InterPro: IPR013092
- PROSITE: PDOC00341
- TCDB: 1.A.24
- OPM superfamily: 194
- OPM protein: 2zw3
Available protein structures:
- PDB: IPR013092 PF00029 (ECOD; PDBsum)
- AlphaFold: IPR013092; PF00029

Connexins (Cx) (TC# 1.A.24), or gap junction proteins, are structurally related transmembrane proteins that assemble to form vertebrate gap junctions. An entirely different family of proteins, the innexins, forms gap junctions in invertebrates. Each gap junction channel is composed of two hemichannels, or connexons, which consist of homo- or heterohexameric arrays of connexins, and the connexon in one plasma membrane docks end-to-end with a connexon in the membrane of a closely opposed cell. The hemichannel is made of six connexin subunits, each of which consist of four transmembrane segments. Gap junctions are essential for many physiological processes, such as the coordinated depolarization of cardiac muscle, proper embryonic development, and the conducted response in microvasculature. Connexins also have non-channel dependant functions relating to cytoskeleton and cell migration. For these reasons, mutations in connexin-encoding genes can lead to functional and developmental abnormalities.

== Nomenclature ==
Connexins are commonly named according to their molecular weights, e.g. Cx26 is the connexin protein of 26 kDa. A competing nomenclature is the gap junction protein system, where connexins are sorted by their α (GJA) and β (GJB) forms, with additional connexins grouped into the C, D and E groupings, followed by an identifying number, e.g. GJA1 corresponds to Cx43. Following a vote at the Gap Junction Conference (2007) in Elsinore the community agreed to use the GJ nomenclature system for the genes that encode connexins, but wished to retain the connexin nomenclature for the encoded proteins using the weight of the human protein for the numbering of orthologous proteins.

== Structure ==

Connexins contain four highly ordered transmembrane segments (TMSs), primarily unstructured C and N cytoplasmic termini, a cytoplasmic loop (CL) and two extra-cellular loops, (EL-1) and (EL-2). Connexins are assembled in groups of six to form hemichannels, or connexons, and two hemichannels then combine to form a gap junction channel.

The crystal structure of the gap junction channel formed by human Cx26 (also known as GJB2) at 3.5 Å resolution is available. The density map showed the two membrane-spanning hemichannels and the arrangement of the four TMSs of the six protomers forming each hemichannel. The hemichannels feature a positively charged cytoplasmic entrance, a funnel, a negatively charged transmembrane pathway, and an extracellular cavity. The pore is narrowed at the funnel, which is formed by the six amino-terminal helices lining the wall of the channel, which thus determines the molecular size restriction at the channel entrance.

The connexin gene family is diverse, with twenty-one identified members in the sequenced human genome, and twenty in the mouse (nineteen of which are orthologous pairs). They usually weigh between 25 and 60 kDa, and have an average length of 380 amino acids. The various connexins have been observed to combine into both homomeric and heteromeric gap junctions, each of which may exhibit different functional properties including pore conductance, size selectivity, charge selectivity, voltage gating, and chemical gating.

== Biosynthesis and internalization ==
A remarkable aspect of connexins is that they have a relatively short half-life of only a few hours. The result is the presence of a dynamic cycle by which connexins are synthesized and replaced. It has been suggested that this short life span allows for more finely regulated physiological processes to take place, such as in the myometrium.

=== From the nucleus to the membrane ===
As they are being translated by ribosomes, connexins are inserted into the membrane of the endoplasmic reticulum (ER). It is in the ER that connexins are properly folded, yielding two extracellular loops, EL-1 and EL-2. It is also in the ER that the oligomerization of connexin molecules into hemichannels begins, a process which may continue in the UR-Golgi intermediate compartment as well. The arrangements of these hemichannels can be homotypic, heterotypic, and combined heterotypic/heteromeric. After exiting the ER and passing through the ERGIC, the folded connexins will usually enter the cis-Golgi network. However, some connexins, such as Cx26 may be transported independent of the Golgi.

=== Gap junction assembly ===
After being inserted into the plasma membrane of the cell, the hemichannels freely diffuse within the lipid bilayer. Through the aid of specific proteins, mainly cadherins, the hemichannels are able to dock with hemichannels of adjacent cells forming gap junction channels. Recent studies have shown the existence of communication between adherens junctions and gap junctions, suggesting a higher level of coordination than previously thought.

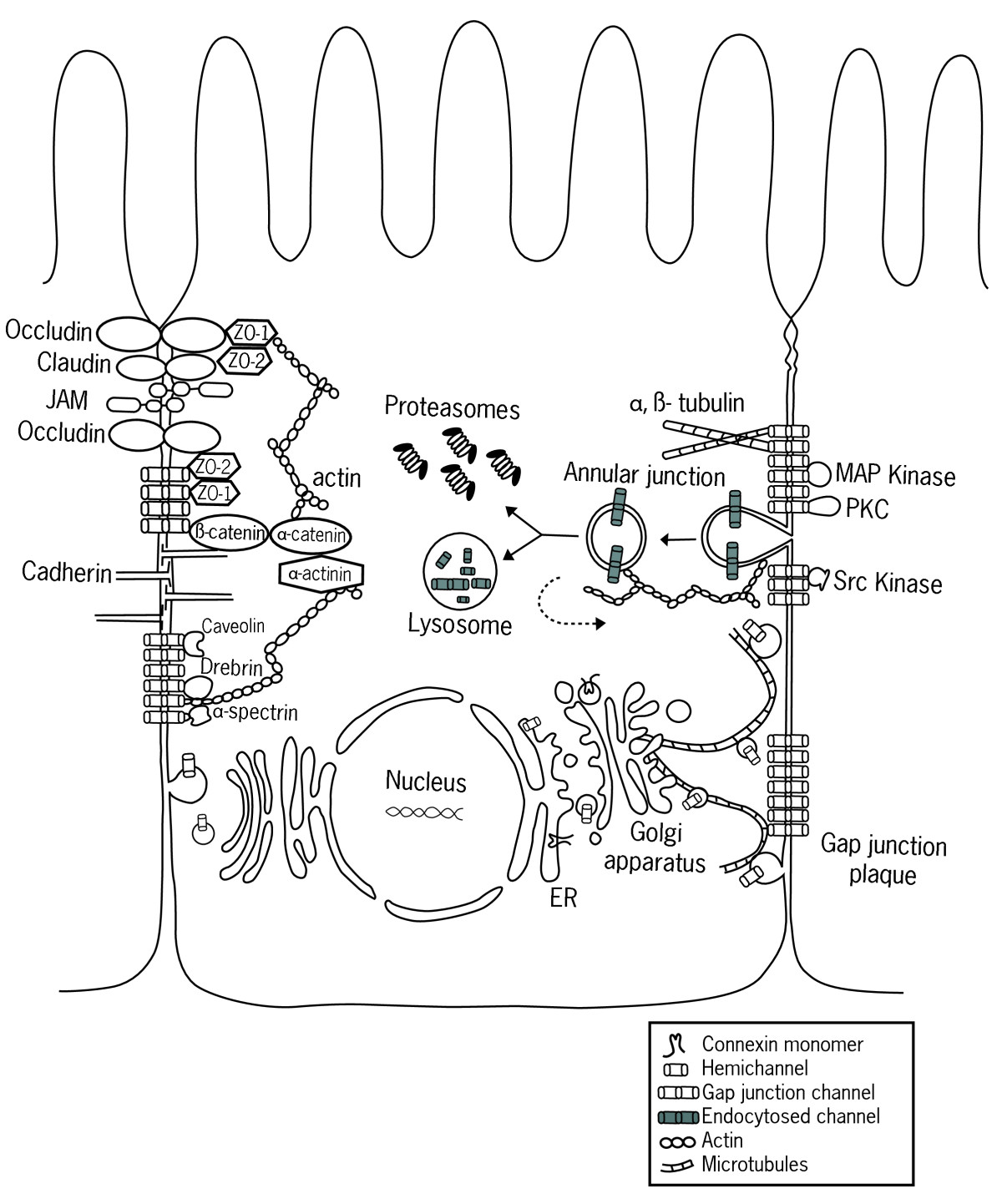
Life cycle and protein associations of connexins. Connexins are synthesized on ER-bound ribosomes and inserted into the ER cotranslationally. This is followed by oligomerization between the ER and trans-Golgi network (depending on the connexin type) into connexons, which are then delivered to the membrane via the actin or microtubule networks. Connexons may also be delivered to the plasma membrane by direct transfer from the rough ER. Upon insertion into the membrane, connexons may remain as hemichannels or they dock with compatible connexons on adjacent cells to form gap junctions. Newly delivered connexons are added to the periphery of pre-formed gap junctions, while the central "older" gap junction fragment are degraded by internalization of a double-membrane structure called an annular junction into one of the two cells, where subsequent lysosomal or proteasomal degradation occurs, or in some cases the connexons are recycled to the membrane (indicated by dashed arrow). During their life cycle, connexins associate with different proteins, including (1) cytoskeletal components as microtubules, actin, and actin-binding proteins α-spectrin and drebrin, (2) junctional molecules including adherens junction components such as cadherins, α-catenin, and β-catenin, as well as tight junction components such as ZO-1 and ZO-2, (3) enzymes such as kinases and phosphatases which regulate the assembly, function, and degradation, and (4) other proteins such as caveolin. This image was prepared by Hanaa Hariri for Dbouk et al., 2009.

== Function ==
Connexin gap junctions are found only in vertebrates, while a functionally analogous (but genetically unrelated) group of proteins, the innexins, are responsible for gap junctions in invertebrate species. Innexin orthologs have also been identified in Chordates, but they are no longer capable of forming gap junctions. Instead, the channels formed by these proteins (called pannexins) act as very large transmembrane pores that connect the intra- and extracellular compartments.

Within the CNS, gap junctions provide electrical coupling between progenitor cells, neurons, and glial cells. By using specific connexin knockout mice, studies revealed that cell coupling is essential for visual signaling. In the retina, ambient light levels influence cell coupling provided by gap junction channels, adapting the visual function for various lighting conditions. Cell coupling is governed by several mechanisms, including connexin expression.

Decrock et al.. have discussed a multilevel platform via which connexins and pannexins can influence the following cellular functions within a tissue: (1) connexin gap junctional channels (GJCs) enable direct cell-cell communication of small molecules, (2) connexin hemichannels and pannexin channels can contribute to autocrine/paracrine signaling pathways, and (3) different structural domains of these proteins allow for channel-independent functions, such as cell-cell adhesion, interactions with the cytoskeleton, and the activation of intracellular signaling pathways. Thus, connexins and pannexins have multifaceted contributions to brain development and specific processes in the neuro-glio-vascular unit, including synaptic transmission and plasticity, glial signaling, vasomotor control, cell movement, and blood-brain barrier integrity in the mature CNS.

=== Substrate specificity ===
Different connexins may exhibit differing specificities for solutes. For example, adenosine passed about 12-fold better through channels formed by Cx32 while AMP and ADP passed about 8-fold better, and ATP greater than 300-fold better, through channels formed by Cx43. Thus, addition of phosphate to adenosine appears to shift its relative permeability from channels formed by Cx32 to channels formed by Cx43. This may have functional consequence because the energy status of a cell could be controlled via connexin expression and channel formation.

=== Transport reaction ===
The transport reaction catalyzed by connexin gap junctions is:

Small molecules (cell 1 cytoplasm) ⇌ small molecules (cell 2 cytoplasm)

== Human connexins and clinical significance ==
Connexin	Gene	Location and Function
Cx43	GJA1	Expressed at the surface of vasculature with atherosclerotic plaque, and up-regulated during atherosclerosis in mice. May have pathological effects. Also expressed between granulosa cells, which is required for proliferation. Normally expressed in astrocytes, also detected in most of the human astrocytomas and in the astroglial component of glioneuronal tumors. It is also the main cardiac connexin, found mainly in ventricular myocardium. Associated with oculodentodigital dysplasia.
Cx46	GJA3	
Cx37	GJA4	Induced in vascular smooth muscle during coronary arteriogenesis. Cx37 mutations are not lethal. Forms gap junctions between oocytes and granulosa cells, and are required for oocyte survival.
Cx40	GJA5	Expressed selectively in atrial myocytes. Responsible for mediating the coordinated electrical activation of atria.
Cx33	GJA6 (GJA6P)	Pseudogene in humans
Cx50	GJA8	Gap junctions between A-typ horizontal cells in mouse and rabbit retina
Cx59	GJA10	
Cx62	GJA10	Human Cx62 complies Cx57 (mouse). Location in axon-bearing B-typ horizontal cell in rabbit retina
Cx32	GJB1	Major component of the peripheral myelin. Mutations in the human gene cause X-linked Charcot-Marie-Tooth disease, a hereditary neuropathy. In human normal brain CX32 expressed in neurons and oligodendrocytes.
Cx26	GJB2	Mutated in Vohwinkel syndrome as well as Keratitis-Icthyosis-Deafness (KID) Syndrome.
Cx31	GJB3	Can be associated with Erythrokeratodermia variabilis.
Cx30.3	GJB4	Fonseca et al. confirmed Cx30.3 expression in thymocytes. Can be associated with Erythrokeratodermia variabilis.
Cx31.1	GJB5	
Cx30	GJB6	Mutated in Clouston syndrome (hidrotic ectodermal dysplasia)
Cx25	GJB7	
Cx45	GJC1/GJA7	Human pancreatic ductal epithelial cells. Atrio-ventricular node.
Cx47	GJC2/GJA12	Expressed in oligodendrocyte gap junctions
Cx31.3	GJC3	Human ortholog of murine Cx29. Not known to form gap junctions.
Cx36	GJD2/GJA9	Pancreatic beta cell function, mediating the release of insulin. Neurons throughout the central nervous system where they synchronize neural activity.
Cx31.9	GJD3/GJC1	
Cx39	GJD4	
Cx40.1	GJD4	
Cx23	GJE1	

Gap junctions are essential for many physiological processes, such as the coordinated depolarization of cardiac muscle, proper embryonic development, and the conducted response in microvasculature. For this reason, deletion or mutation of the various connexin isoforms produces distinctive phenotypes and pathologies. While mutations in Cx43 are mostly linked to oculodentodigital dysplasia, Cx47 mutations are associated with Pelizaeus-Merzbacher-like disease and lymphedema. Cx40 mutations are principally linked to atrial fibrillation. Mutations in Cx37 have not yet been described, but polymorphisms in the Cx37 gene have been implicated in the development of arterial disease.

== Sources ==
- As of this edit, this article uses content from "1.A.24 The Gap Junction-forming Connexin (Connexin) Family", which is licensed in a way that permits reuse under the Creative Commons Attribution-ShareAlike 3.0 Unported License, but not under the GFDL. All relevant terms must be followed.
