= Vinnexin =

Identifiers
- Symbol: Vinnexin
- InterPro: IPR039099
Available protein structures:
- PDB: IPR039099
- AlphaFold: IPR039099

Vinnexin is a transmembrane protein whose DNA code is held in a virus genome. When the virus genome is expressed in a cell the vinnexin gene from the virus is made into a functioning protein by the infected cell. The vinnexin protein is then incorporated into the host's cell membranes to alter the way the hosts cells communicate with each other. The altered communication aids the transmission and replication of the virus in complex ways. The communication structure that the vinnexin is involved in is the gap junction and vinnexin forms part of a wider family of proteins that are innexin homologues referred to as pannexins. So far Vinnexins have only been found in Adenovirus and the way they affect the functioning of innexins is being studied in great detail.

== Discovery ==
Vinnexin was first described in 2005 in an adenovirus as a gene homologue of an insect gap protein called innexin.

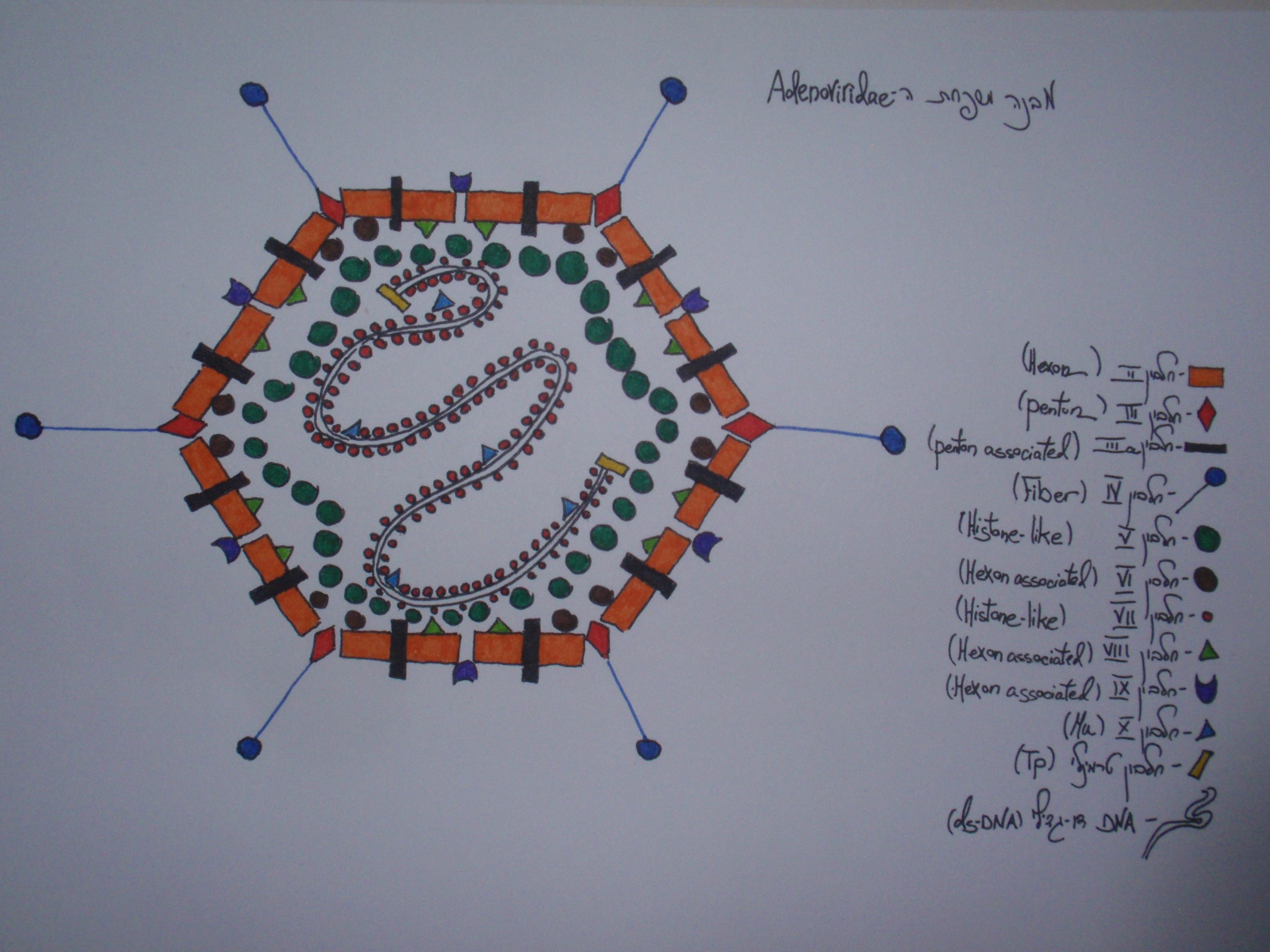
Adenovirus structure showing the double stranded DNA inside the virus coat of proteins. The vinnexin gene is coded by one part of this double stranded DNA. The vinnexin protein itself is only manufactured by and found in the host, not the virus itself.

Vinnexins were shown to be used by the adenovirus to help Incheon wasps successfully inject their eggs into the caterpillars they parasitize.

== Structure ==
The ultrastructure of Vinnexin is yet to be studied in detail. As an innexin homologue that functions in a similar way to innexins vinnexins are likely to have four transmembrane segments (TMSs) and, like the vertebrate connexin gap junction protein, vinnexin subunits assemble together to form a channel in the plasma membrane of the cell.

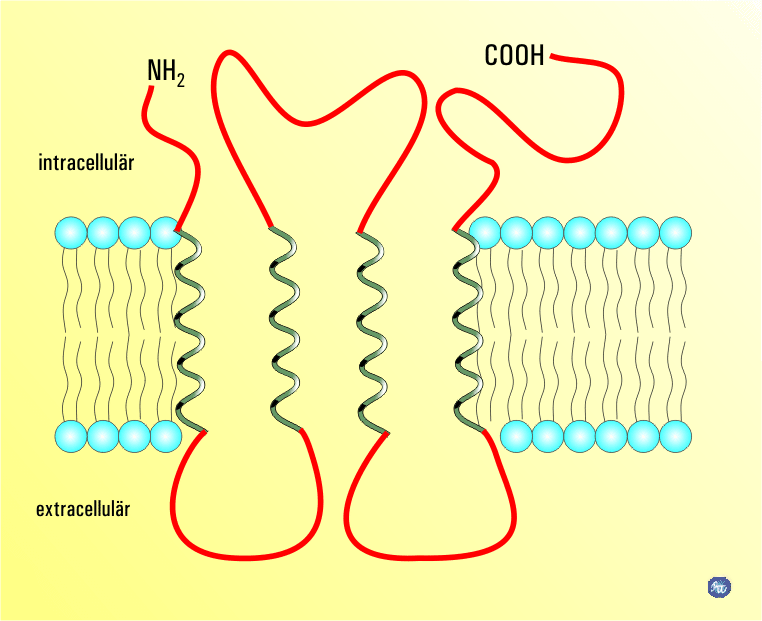
Vinnexin homology with innexins and connexins mean this simple connexin model will reflect the basic structure of the vinnexin protein as it appears in a cell membrane

== Function ==
Fundamentally vinnexins have been shown to behave like the native innexins in insects. They participate in gap junctions to form transmembrane communication channels. At a higher level vinnexins must differ sufficiently from native innexins to alter the way the caterpillar host cells behave. Without the virus with its vinnexin gene the egg of certain wasps would be rejected by the caterpillar and the egg would die. The virus and wasp are obligately associated.

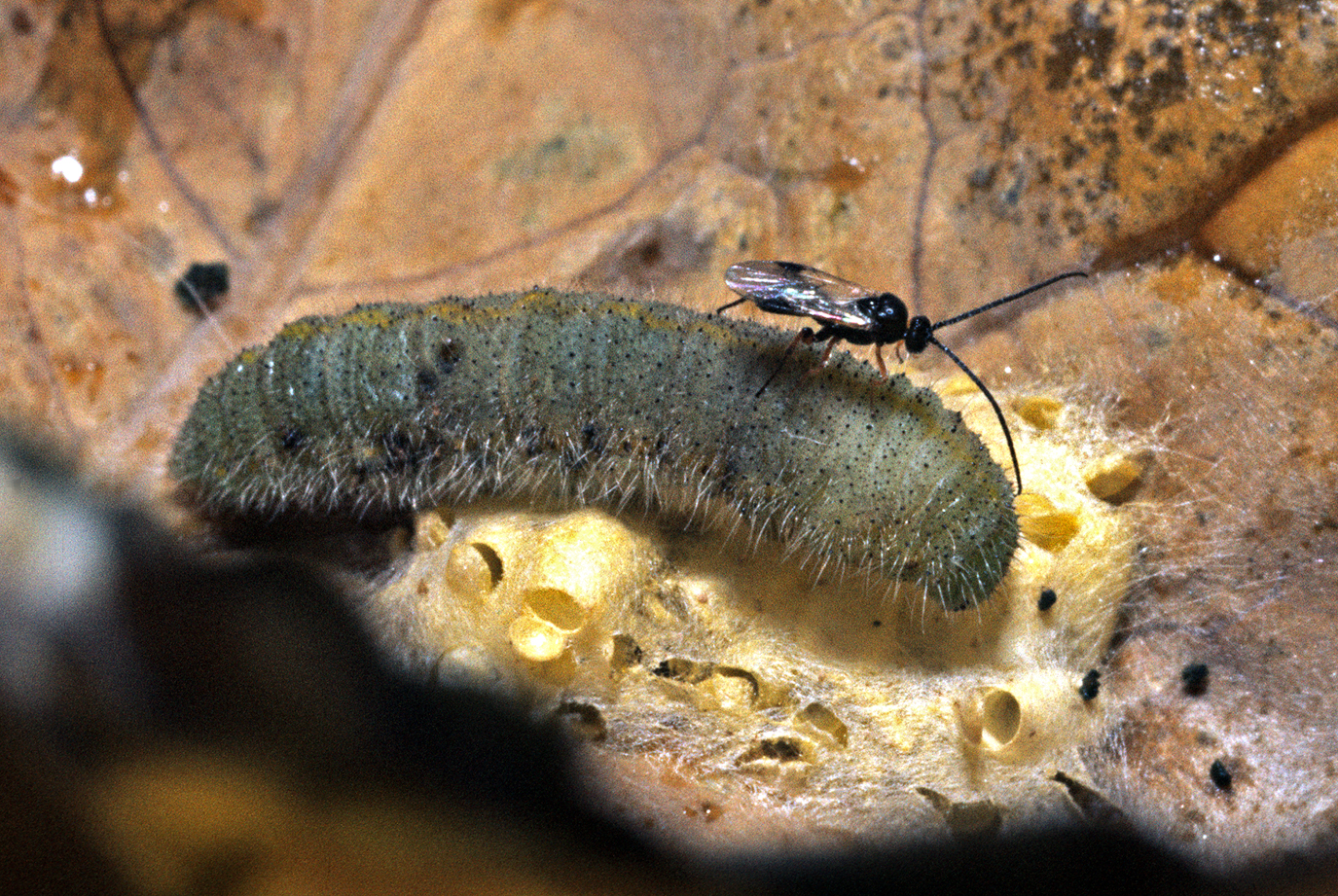
Smaller parasitoid wasp on much larger caterpillar. The adenovirus will replicate in the ovaries of certain parasitoid wasps, similar to the one pictured. No vinnexins are produced in the wasp. Only the DNA for the vinnexin is replicated in the wasp ovaries for injection into the caterpillar along with the wasp's egg. Once injected into the caterpillar the virus does not replicated but injected virus infects cells so the vinnexin gene is translated into the vinnexin protein by the caterpillar's own cells. Once vinnexin is in the cells it helps to prevent the caterpillar rejecting the wasp egg.

While the virus genes are expressed in the caterpillar the viral DNA including the vinnexin gene does not replicate its genes there. Replication of the virus including the vennexin gene occurs in the ovaries of the wasp.

=== Transport reaction ===
The transport reactions catalyzed by innexin gap junctions which are considered similar to vinnexins are:

Small molecules (cell 1 cytoplasm) ⇌ small molecules (cell 2 cytoplasm)

Or for hemichannels:

Small molecules (cell cytoplasm) ⇌ small molecules (out)

== See also ==
- innexin
- connexin
- pannexin
