= Keratosis palmoplantaris transgrediens et progrediens =

Keratosis palmoplantaris transgrediens et progrediens may refer to:

- Erythrokeratodermia variabilis
- Palmoplantar keratoderma of Sybert
