= Keratosis extremitatum progrediens =

Keratosis extremitatum progrediens may refer to:

- Diffuse nonepidermolytic palmoplantar keratoderma
- Erythrokeratodermia variabilis
