= GJB5 =

Protein found in humans

Identifiers
- Aliases: GJB5, CX31.1, gap junction protein beta 5
- External IDs: OMIM: 604493; MGI: 95723; GeneCards: GJB5

Gene location (Human)
Chr.	Chromosome 1 (human)
Band	1p34.3	Start	34,755,047 bp
Band	1p34.3	End	34,758,512 bp

Gene location (Mouse)
Chr.	Chromosome 4 (mouse)
Band	4 D2.2|4 61.51 cM	Start	127,248,602 bp
Band	4 D2.2|4 61.51 cM	End	127,251,974 bp
RNA expression pattern
Bgee	Human / Mouse (ortholog); Top expressed in: skin of abdomen; skin of leg; skin of arm; skin of thigh; gums; gingival epithelium; epithelium of esophagus; olfactory zone of nasal mucosa; oral cavity; palpebral conjunctiva / Top expressed in: skin of external ear; blastocyst; lip; skin of back; tail of embryo; skin of abdomen; decidua; epidermis; morula; hair follicle; More reference expression data
BioGPS	n/a
Orthologs
Databases	NCBI: entry; OMA: entry
Species	Human	Mouse
Entrez	2709	14622
Ensembl	ENSG00000189280	ENSMUSG00000042357
UniProt	O95377	Q02739
RefSeq (mRNA)	NM_005268	NM_010291
RefSeq (protein)	NP_005259	NP_034421
Location (UCSC)	Chr 1: 34.76 – 34.76 Mb	Chr 4: 127.25 – 127.25 Mb
PubMed search
- Wikidata
View/Edit Human	View/Edit Mouse

Gap junction beta-5 protein (GJB5), also known as connexin-31.1 (Cx31.1), is a protein that in humans is encoded by the GJB5 gene.

== Function ==
Gap junctions are conduits that allow the direct cell-to-cell passage of small cytoplasmic molecules, including ions, metabolic intermediates, and second messengers, and thereby mediate intercellular metabolic and electrical communication. Gap junction channels consist of connexin protein subunits, which are encoded by a multigene family.
