= GJA5 =

Protein found in humans

Identifiers
- Aliases: GJA5, ATFB11, CX40, gap junction protein alpha 5
- External IDs: OMIM: 121013; MGI: 95716; GeneCards: GJA5

Gene location (Human)
Chr.	Chromosome 1 (human)
Band	1q21.2	Start	147,756,199 bp
Band	1q21.2	End	147,773,362 bp

Gene location (Mouse)
Chr.	Chromosome 3 (mouse)
Band	3 F2.1|3 42.04 cM	Start	96,812,009 bp
Band	3 F2.1|3 42.04 cM	End	96,984,732 bp
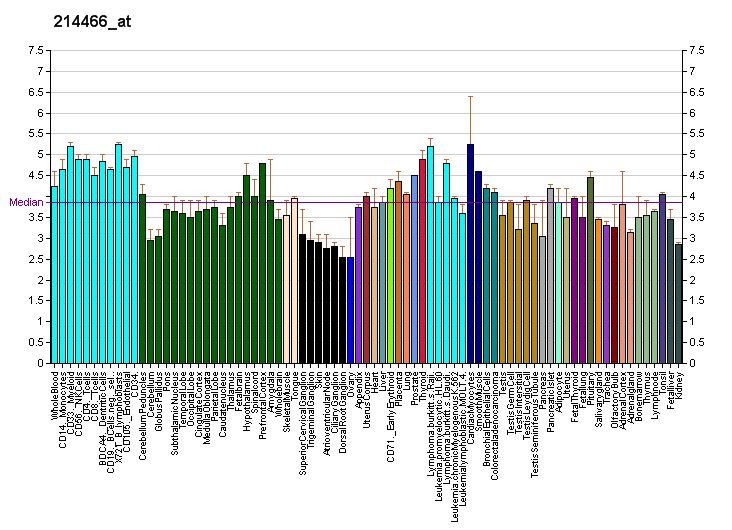
RNA expression pattern
Bgee	Human / Mouse (ortholog); Top expressed in: placenta; right coronary artery; left coronary artery; right auricle of heart; lower lobe of lung; popliteal artery; tibial arteries; upper lobe of lung; Descending thoracic aorta; upper lobe of left lung / Top expressed in: yolk sac; vascular endothelium; vasculature of trunk; footplate; dorsal aorta; atrium; primordial ventricle; tongue muscle; myocardium of atrium; abdominal aorta; More reference expression data
BioGPS	More reference expression data
Gene ontology
Molecular function	gap junction channel activity involved in cardiac conduction electrical coupling; gap junction channel activity; gap junction channel activity involved in AV node cell-bundle of His cell electrical coupling; gap junction hemi-channel activity; gap junction channel activity involved in SA node cell-atrial cardiac muscle cell electrical coupling; gap junction channel activity involved in atrial cardiac muscle cell-AV node cell electrical coupling; gap junction channel activity involved in bundle of His cell-Purkinje myocyte electrical coupling; gap junction channel activity involved in Purkinje myocyte-ventricular cardiac muscle cell electrical coupling; disordered domain specific binding; connexin binding
Cellular component	integral component of membrane; cell projection; membrane; intercalated disc; plasma membrane; integral component of plasma membrane; cell junction; gap junction; connexin complex
Biological process	bundle of His cell to Purkinje myocyte communication by electrical coupling; skeletal system development; regulation of ventricular cardiac muscle cell membrane depolarization; cardiac conduction system development; ventricular septum development; negative regulation of blood pressure; ventricular septum morphogenesis; SA node cell action potential; AV node cell to bundle of His cell communication; regulation of atrial cardiac muscle cell membrane depolarization; ventricular cardiac muscle cell action potential; cell communication by electrical coupling involved in cardiac conduction; outflow tract morphogenesis; atrial ventricular junction remodeling; cell communication by electrical coupling; mitral valve development; pulmonary valve formation; embryonic heart tube development; regulation of Purkinje myocyte action potential; atrial septum morphogenesis; cell communication; potassium ion transport; regulation of bundle of His cell action potential; development of the heart; regulation of renin secretion into blood stream; blood vessel development; cardiac conduction; embryonic limb morphogenesis; protein complex oligomerization; AV node cell to bundle of His cell communication by electrical coupling; positive regulation of vasoconstriction; angiogenesis; artery morphogenesis; transmembrane transport; endothelium development; renal system process involved in regulation of systemic arterial blood pressure; regulation of systemic arterial blood pressure; gap junction assembly; positive regulation of cell communication by chemical coupling; cell communication involved in cardiac conduction; regulation of cardiac muscle contraction; septum primum development; regulation of heart rate by cardiac conduction; regulation of AV node cell action potential; negative regulation of glomerular filtration; atrial septum development; vasomotion; foramen ovale closure; cell communication by chemical coupling; regulation of atrial cardiac muscle cell action potential; regulation of ventricular cardiac muscle cell membrane repolarization; regulation of membrane depolarization during cardiac muscle cell action potential; SA node cell to atrial cardiac muscle cell communication by electrical coupling; atrial cardiac muscle cell to AV node cell communication by electrical coupling; Purkinje myocyte to ventricular cardiac muscle cell communication by electrical coupling; blood vessel diameter maintenance
Sources:Amigo / QuickGO
Orthologs
Databases	NCBI: entry; OMA: entry
Species	Human	Mouse
Entrez	2702	14613
Ensembl	ENSG00000265107	ENSMUSG00000057123
UniProt	P36382	Q01231
RefSeq (mRNA)	NM_005266; NM_181703	NM_001271628; NM_008121
RefSeq (protein)	NP_005257; NP_859054	NP_001258557; NP_032147
Location (UCSC)	Chr 1: 147.76 – 147.77 Mb	Chr 3: 96.81 – 96.98 Mb
PubMed search
- Wikidata
View/Edit Human	View/Edit Mouse

Gap junction alpha-5 protein (GJA5), also known as connexin 40 (Cx40), is a protein that in humans is encoded by the GJA5 gene.

== Function ==
This gene is a member of the connexin gene family. The encoded protein is a component of gap junctions, which are composed of arrays of intercellular channels that provide a route for the diffusion of low molecular weight materials from cell to cell. Mutations in this gene may be associated with atrial fibrillation. Alternatively spliced transcript variants encoding the same isoform have been described.

GJA5 has been identified as the gene that is responsible for the phenotypes observed with congenital heart diseases on the 1q21.1 location. In case of a duplication of GJA5 tetralogy of Fallot is more common. In case of a deletion other congenital heart diseases than tetralogy of Fallot are more common.

== Related gene problems ==
- 1q21.1 deletion syndrome
- 1q21.1 duplication syndrome

== See also ==
- Connexin
- Gap junction
