= GJA10 =

Protein-coding gene in the species Homo sapiens

Identifiers
- Aliases: GJA10, CX62, gap junction protein alpha 10
- External IDs: OMIM: 611924; MGI: 1339969; HomoloGene: 7733; GeneCards: GJA10; OMA:GJA10 - orthologs

Gene location (Human)
Chr.	Chromosome 6 (human)
Band	6q15	Start	89,894,469 bp
Band	6q15	End	89,921,760 bp

Gene location (Mouse)
Chr.	Chromosome 4 (mouse)
Band	4 A5|4 14.25 cM	Start	32,596,960 bp
Band	4 A5|4 14.25 cM	End	32,602,760 bp
RNA expression pattern
Bgee	Human / Mouse (ortholog); Top expressed in: testicle; gonad; left testis; right testis; prefrontal cortex / Top expressed in: embryo; zygote; neural layer of retina; secondary oocyte; primary oocyte; subdivision of hippocampus; Region I of hippocampus proper; gland; adipose tissue; endocrine gland; More reference expression data
BioGPS	n/a
Gene ontology
Molecular function	gap junction channel activity
Cellular component	integral component of membrane; gap junction; cell junction; plasma membrane; connexin complex; membrane
Biological process	synapse assembly; cell communication; gamete generation; transmembrane transport; response to light stimulus; detection of light stimulus involved in visual perception
Sources:Amigo / QuickGO
Orthologs
Species	Human	Mouse
Entrez	84694	14610
Ensembl	ENSG00000135355; ENSG00000288435	ENSMUSG00000051056
UniProt	Q969M2	Q9WUS4
RefSeq (mRNA)	NM_032602	NM_010289
RefSeq (protein)	NP_115991	NP_034419
Location (UCSC)	Chr 6: 89.89 – 89.92 Mb	Chr 4: 32.6 – 32.6 Mb
PubMed search
- Wikidata
View/Edit Human	View/Edit Mouse

Gap junction alpha-10 protein, also known as connexin-62 (Cx62), is a protein that in humans is encoded by the GJA10 gene.

Connexins, such as GJA10, are involved in the formation of gap junctions, intercellular conduits that directly connect the cytoplasms of contacting cells. Each gap junction channel is formed by docking of 2 hemichannels, each of which contains 6 connexin subunits.
