= GJA4 =

Protein-coding gene in humans

Identifiers
- Aliases: GJA4, CX37, gap junction protein alpha 4
- External IDs: OMIM: 121012; MGI: 95715; GeneCards: GJA4

Gene location (Human)
Chr.	Chromosome 1 (human)
Band	1p34.3	Start	34,792,999 bp
Band	1p34.3	End	34,795,747 bp

Gene location (Mouse)
Chr.	Chromosome 4 (mouse)
Band	4 D2.2|4 61.47 cM	Start	127,205,214 bp
Band	4 D2.2|4 61.47 cM	End	127,207,832 bp
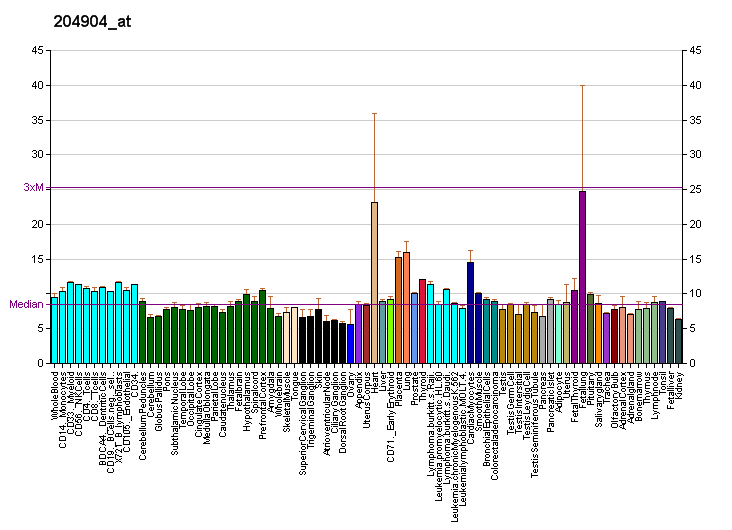

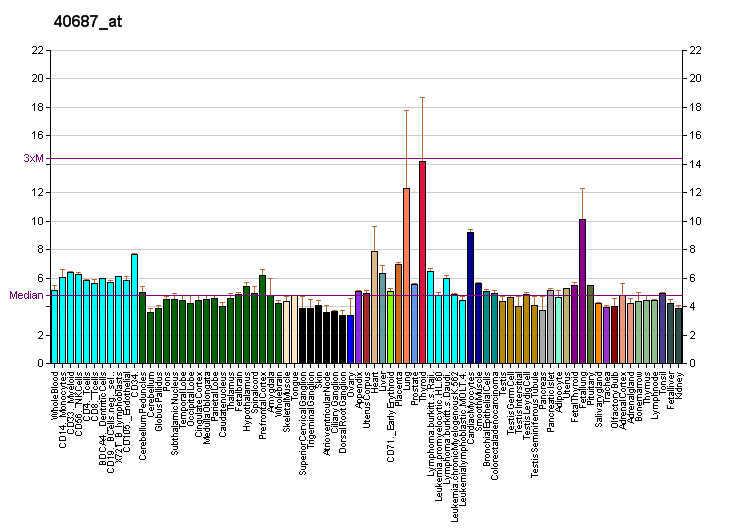
RNA expression pattern
Bgee	Human / Mouse (ortholog); Top expressed in: tibial arteries; apex of heart; right lung; vena cava; left ventricle; left coronary artery; right lobe of thyroid gland; right coronary artery; subcutaneous adipose tissue; right ventricle / Top expressed in: primary oocyte; morula; external carotid artery; internal carotid artery; secondary oocyte; zygote; right lung; right lung lobe; left lung; ankle joint; More reference expression data
BioGPS	More reference expression data
Gene ontology
Molecular function	protein binding
Cellular component	integral component of membrane; gap junction; cell junction; plasma membrane; integral component of plasma membrane; connexin complex; membrane
Biological process	cell communication; cell-cell signaling; blood vessel development; response to pain; calcium ion transport; cell-cell junction assembly; endothelium development
Sources:Amigo / QuickGO
Orthologs
Databases	NCBI: entry; OMA: entry
Species	Human	Mouse
Entrez	2701	14612
Ensembl	ENSG00000187513	ENSMUSG00000050234
UniProt	P35212	P28235
RefSeq (mRNA)	NM_002060	NM_008120
RefSeq (protein)	NP_002051	NP_032146
Location (UCSC)	Chr 1: 34.79 – 34.8 Mb	Chr 4: 127.21 – 127.21 Mb
PubMed search
- Wikidata
View/Edit Human	View/Edit Mouse

Gap junction alpha-4 protein, also known as Connexin-37 or Cx37, is a protein that in humans is encoded by the GJA4 gene. This protein, like other Connexin proteins, forms connections between cells known as gap junctions. Connexin 37 can be found in many tissues including the ovary, heart, and kidney.
