= GJD3 =

Protein-coding gene in the species Homo sapiens

Identifiers
- Aliases: GJD3, CX31.9, Cx30.2, GJA11, GJC1, gap junction protein delta 3
- External IDs: OMIM: 607425; MGI: 2384150; HomoloGene: 17530; GeneCards: GJD3; OMA:GJD3 - orthologs

Gene location (Human)
Chr.	Chromosome 17 (human)
Band	17q21.2	Start	40,360,652 bp
Band	17q21.2	End	40,364,737 bp

Gene location (Mouse)
Chr.	Chromosome 11 (mouse)
Band	11|11 D	Start	98,873,006 bp
Band	11|11 D	End	98,873,842 bp
RNA expression pattern
Bgee	Human / Mouse (ortholog); Top expressed in: gonad; apex of heart; spleen; mucosa of ileum; stromal cell of endometrium; left ventricle; right lung; gallbladder; mucosa of transverse colon; smooth muscle tissue / Top expressed in: spermatocyte; embryo; spermatid; embryo; primary visual cortex; testicle; Cortex of frontal lobe; superior frontal gyrus; neural tube; striatum of neuraxis; More reference expression data
BioGPS	n/a
Gene ontology
Molecular function	ion channel activity; gap junction channel activity; protein binding; gap junction channel activity involved in cardiac conduction electrical coupling
Cellular component	integral component of membrane; gap junction; cell surface; cell junction; plasma membrane; integral component of plasma membrane; connexin complex; membrane
Biological process	gap junction assembly; cell communication; ion transmembrane transport; response to glucose; transmembrane transport; cell communication involved in cardiac conduction; cell communication by electrical coupling involved in cardiac conduction
Sources:Amigo / QuickGO
Orthologs
Species	Human	Mouse
Entrez	125111	353155
Ensembl	ENSG00000183153	ENSMUSG00000047197
UniProt	Q8N144	Q91YD1
RefSeq (mRNA)	NM_152219	NM_178596
RefSeq (protein)	NP_689343	NP_848711
Location (UCSC)	Chr 17: 40.36 – 40.36 Mb	Chr 11: 98.87 – 98.87 Mb
PubMed search
- Wikidata
View/Edit Human	View/Edit Mouse

Gap junction delta-2 (GJD2), also known as connexin-36 (Cx36) or gap junction alpha-9 (GJA9), is a protein that in humans is encoded by the GJD2 gene.

== Function ==
This gene is a member of the large family of connexins that are required for the formation of gap junctions. Six connexin monomers form a hemichannel, or connexon, on the cell surface. This connexon can interact with a connexon from a neighboring cell, thus forming a channel linking the cytoplasm of the 2 cells.
