= GJD4 =

Protein-coding gene in the species Homo sapiens

Identifiers
- Aliases: GJD4, CX40.1, gap junction protein delta 4
- External IDs: OMIM: 611922; MGI: 2444990; HomoloGene: 17692; GeneCards: GJD4; OMA:GJD4 - orthologs

Gene location (Human)
Chr.	Chromosome 10 (human)
Band	10p11.21	Start	35,605,341 bp
Band	10p11.21	End	35,608,935 bp

Gene location (Mouse)
Chr.	Chromosome 18 (mouse)
Band	18|18 A1	Start	9,278,607 bp
Band	18|18 A1	End	9,282,809 bp
RNA expression pattern
Bgee	Human / Mouse (ortholog); Top expressed in: gonad; apex of heart; prefrontal cortex; ventricle of the heart; left ventricle; human musculoskeletal system; dorsolateral prefrontal cortex; Brodmann area 9; muscular system; muscle / Top expressed in: tongue muscle; muscle of trunk; thoracic diaphragm; neural tube; autopod region; paraxial mesoderm; foot; hand; foregut; muscle of upper limb; More reference expression data
BioGPS	n/a
Orthologs
Species	Human	Mouse
Entrez	219770	225152
Ensembl	ENSG00000177291	ENSMUSG00000036855
UniProt	Q96KN9	Q8BSD4
RefSeq (mRNA)	NM_153368	NM_153086
RefSeq (protein)	NP_699199	NP_694726
Location (UCSC)	Chr 10: 35.61 – 35.61 Mb	Chr 18: 9.28 – 9.28 Mb
PubMed search
- Wikidata
View/Edit Human	View/Edit Mouse

Gap junction delta-4 protein (GJD4), also known as connexin-40.1 (Cx40.1), is a protein that in humans is encoded by the GJD4 gene.

== Function ==
Connexins, such as GJD4, are involved in the formation of gap junctions, intercellular conduits that directly connect the cytoplasms of contacting cells. Each gap junction channel is formed by docking of 2 hemichannels, each of which contains 6 connexin subunits.
