= GJC1 =

Protein-coding gene in the species Homo sapiens

Available structures
PDB	Ortholog search: PDBe RCSB
PDB	List of PDB id codes 3SHW

Identifiers
- Aliases: GJC1, CX45, GJA7, gap junction protein gamma 1
- External IDs: OMIM: 608655; MGI: 95718; HomoloGene: 4016; GeneCards: GJC1; OMA:GJC1 - orthologs

Gene location (Human)
Chr.	Chromosome 17 (human)
Band	17q21.31	Start	44,798,448 bp
Band	17q21.31	End	44,830,816 bp

Gene location (Mouse)
Chr.	Chromosome 11 (mouse)
Band	11|11 E1	Start	102,690,405 bp
Band	11|11 E1	End	102,710,526 bp
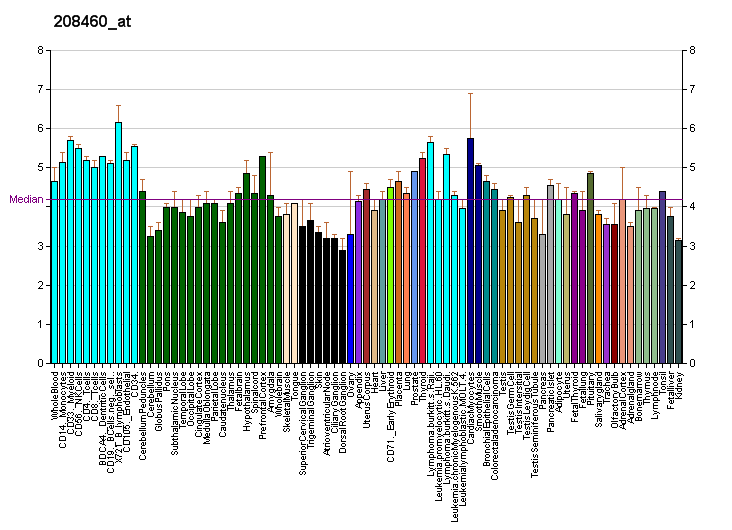
RNA expression pattern
Bgee	Human / Mouse (ortholog); Top expressed in: tail of epididymis; seminal vesicula; cartilage tissue; secondary oocyte; visceral pleura; saphenous vein; placenta; ventricular zone; epithelium of colon; myometrium / Top expressed in: abdominal wall; renal corpuscle; internal carotid artery; superior surface of tongue; vas deferens; endocardial cushion; tail of embryo; external carotid artery; medullary collecting duct; primitive streak; More reference expression data
BioGPS	More reference expression data
Gene ontology
Molecular function	ion channel activity; gap junction channel activity involved in SA node cell-atrial cardiac muscle cell electrical coupling; gap junction channel activity involved in AV node cell-bundle of His cell electrical coupling; gap junction channel activity
Cellular component	integral component of membrane; endoplasmic reticulum membrane; membrane; intercalated disc; plasma membrane; cell junction; gap junction; connexin complex
Biological process	muscle contraction; cell development; cardiac muscle tissue development; cell-cell signaling; vasculogenesis; cell communication; heart development; ion transmembrane transport; atrial cardiac muscle cell action potential; cell-cell junction assembly; visual perception; chemical synaptic transmission; gap junction assembly; SA node cell to atrial cardiac muscle cell communication by electrical coupling; AV node cell to bundle of His cell communication by electrical coupling; transmembrane transport
Sources:Amigo / QuickGO
Orthologs
Species	Human	Mouse
Entrez	10052	14615
Ensembl	ENSG00000182963	ENSMUSG00000034520
UniProt	P36383	P28229
RefSeq (mRNA)	NM_001080383; NM_005497	NM_001159382; NM_001159383; NM_008122; NM_001359040
RefSeq (protein)	NP_001073852; NP_005488	NP_001152854; NP_001152855; NP_032148; NP_001345969
Location (UCSC)	Chr 17: 44.8 – 44.83 Mb	Chr 11: 102.69 – 102.71 Mb
PubMed search
- Wikidata
View/Edit Human	View/Edit Mouse

Gap junction gamma-1 protein (GJC1), also known as gap junction alpha-7 protein (GJA7) and connexin 45 (Cx45) — is a protein that in humans is encoded by the GJC1 gene.

== Function ==
This gene is a member of the connexin gene family. The encoded protein is a component of gap junctions, which are composed of arrays of intercellular channels that provide a route for the diffusion of low molecular weight materials from cell to cell. Alternatively spliced transcript variants encoding the same isoform have been described.
