= Erythrokeratodermia variabilis =

- Other names: Progressive symmetric erythrokeratodermia, Gottron type
- Erythrokeratodermia variabilis is inherited in an autosomal dominant manner of inheritance
- Specialty: Dermatology, medical genetics
- Usual onset: Infancy

Erythrokeratodermia variabilis (also known as "erythrokeratodermia figurata variabilis", "keratosis extremitatum progrediens", "keratosis palmoplantaris transgrediens et progrediens", "Mendes da Costa syndrome", "Mendes da Costa type erythrokeratodermia", and "progressive symmetric erythrokeratoderma") is a rare autosomal dominant disorder that usually presents at birth or during the first year of life. To date, it is thought to be caused by mutations in genes encoding for connexin channels proteins in the epidermis, leading to the misregulation of homeostasis in keratinocytes.

One type is characterized by generalized, persistent, brown hyperkeratosis with accentuated skin markings, while a second type is localized, with involvement that is limited in extent and characterized by sharply demarcated, hyperkeratotic plaques.

It can be associated with GJB3 and GJB4. It was characterized in 1925.

== See also ==
- List of cutaneous conditions
