= GJC3 =

Protein-coding gene in the species Homo sapiens

Identifiers
- Aliases: GJC3, CX29, CX30.2, CX31.3, GJE1, gap junction protein gamma 3
- External IDs: OMIM: 611925; MGI: 2153041; HomoloGene: 15399; GeneCards: GJC3; OMA:GJC3 - orthologs

Gene location (Human)
Chr.	Chromosome 7 (human)
Band	7q22.1	Start	99,923,266 bp
Band	7q22.1	End	99,929,620 bp

Gene location (Mouse)
Chr.	Chromosome 5 (mouse)
Band	5|5 G2	Start	137,951,723 bp
Band	5|5 G2	End	137,961,360 bp
RNA expression pattern
Bgee	Human / Mouse (ortholog); Top expressed in: tibial nerve; body of pancreas; olfactory zone of nasal mucosa; testicle; minor salivary glands; sural nerve; lactiferous gland; prostate; skin of leg; liver / Top expressed in: lumbar subsegment of spinal cord; primary visual cortex; superior frontal gyrus; dentate gyrus of hippocampal formation granule cell; cerebellar cortex; gastrula; deep cerebellar nuclei; sciatic nerve; globus pallidus; anterior horn of spinal cord; More reference expression data
BioGPS	n/a
Gene ontology
Molecular function	protein homodimerization activity; gap junction channel activity involved in AV node cell-bundle of His cell electrical coupling
Cellular component	cell junction; connexin complex; plasma membrane; myelin sheath; membrane; integral component of membrane; gap junction
Biological process	myelination; hearing; cell communication; AV node cell to bundle of His cell communication by electrical coupling
Sources:Amigo / QuickGO
Orthologs
Species	Human	Mouse
Entrez	349149	118446
Ensembl	ENSG00000176402	ENSMUSG00000056966
UniProt	Q8NFK1	Q921C1
RefSeq (mRNA)	NM_181538	NM_080450
RefSeq (protein)	NP_853516	NP_536698
Location (UCSC)	Chr 7: 99.92 – 99.93 Mb	Chr 5: 137.95 – 137.96 Mb
PubMed search
- Wikidata
View/Edit Human	View/Edit Mouse

Gap junction gamma-3, also known as connexin-29 (Cx29) or gap junction epsilon-1 (GJE1), is a protein that in humans is encoded by the GJC3 gene.

GJC3 is a conexin.

== Function ==
This gene encodes a gap junction protein. The encoded protein is known as a connexin, most of which form gap junctions that provide direct connections between neighboring cells. However, Cx29, which is highly expressed in myelin-forming glial cells of the CNS and PNS, has not been documented to form gap junctions in any cell type. In both PNS and CNS myelinated axons, Cx29 is precisely colocalized with Kv1.2 voltage-gated K+ channels, where both proteins are concentrated in the juxtaparanode and along the inner mesaxon. By freeze-fracture immunogold labeling electron microscopy, Cx29 is identified in abundant "rosettes" of transmembrane protein particles in the innermost layer of myelin, directly apposed to equally abundant immunogold-labeled Kv1.1 potassium channels, both in the juxtaparanodal axolemma and along the inner mesaxon. A role in K^{+} handling during saltatory conduction is implied but not yet demonstrated.

== Clinical significance ==
Mutations in this gene have been reported to be associated with nonsyndromic hearing loss.
