= GJC2 =

Protein found in humans

Identifiers
- Aliases: GJC2, CX46.6, Cx47, GJA12, HLD2, LMPH1C, PMLDAR, SPG44, gap junction protein gamma 2, LMPHM3
- External IDs: OMIM: 608803; MGI: 2153060; GeneCards: GJC2

Gene location (Human)
Chr.	Chromosome 1 (human)
Band	1q42.13	Start	228,149,930 bp
Band	1q42.13	End	228,159,826 bp

Gene location (Mouse)
Chr.	Chromosome 11 (mouse)
Band	11 B1.3|11 37.05 cM	Start	59,066,394 bp
Band	11 B1.3|11 37.05 cM	End	59,074,039 bp
RNA expression pattern
Bgee	Human / Mouse (ortholog); Top expressed in: C1 segment; inferior ganglion of vagus nerve; subthalamic nucleus; ventral tegmental area; gonad; pons; medulla oblongata; Brodmann area 10; lateral nuclear group of thalamus; pars compacta / Top expressed in: lumbar subsegment of spinal cord; layer of hippocampus; deep cerebellar nuclei; radiate layer of hippocampus; molecular layer of neocortex; pontine nuclei; lateral geniculate nucleus; pyramidal layer of hippocampus; central gray substance of midbrain; globus pallidus; More reference expression data
BioGPS	n/a
Gene ontology
Molecular function	gap junction channel activity; gap junction channel activity involved in cell communication by electrical coupling
Cellular component	integral component of membrane; myelin sheath; cell junction; plasma membrane; connexin complex; membrane; gap junction; paranode region of axon; soma; perikaryon; proximal neuron projection
Biological process	cell communication; cell-cell signaling; response to toxic substance; transmembrane transport; cell communication by electrical coupling; regulation of protein phosphorylation; brain development; positive regulation of gene expression; positive regulation of oligodendrocyte progenitor proliferation; positive regulation of calcium ion transmembrane transport; negative regulation of G1/S transition of mitotic cell cycle
Sources:Amigo / QuickGO
Orthologs
Databases	NCBI: entry; OMA: entry
Species	Human	Mouse
Entrez	57165	118454
Ensembl	ENSG00000198835	ENSMUSG00000043448
UniProt	Q5T442	Q8BQU6
RefSeq (mRNA)	NM_020435	NM_080454; NM_175452
RefSeq (protein)	NP_065168	NP_536702; NP_780661
Location (UCSC)	Chr 1: 228.15 – 228.16 Mb	Chr 11: 59.07 – 59.07 Mb
PubMed search
- Wikidata
View/Edit Human	View/Edit Mouse

Gap junction gamma-2 (GJC2), also known as connexin-46.6 (Cx46.6) and connexin-47 (Cx47) and gap junction alpha-12 (GJA12), is a protein that in humans is encoded by the GJC2 gene.

== Function ==
This gene encodes a gap junction protein. Gap junction proteins are members of a large family of homologous connexins and comprise 4 transmembrane, 2 extracellular, and 3 cytoplasmic domains. This gene plays a key role in central myelination and is involved in peripheral myelination in humans.

== Clinical significance ==
Homozygous or compound heterozygous defects in this gene are the cause of autosomal recessive Pelizaeus-Merzbacher-like disease-1.

Heterozygous missense mutations in this same gene cause pubertal onset hereditary lymphedema.
