= GJB1 =

Protein-coding gene in humans

Identifiers
- Aliases: GJB1, CMTX, CMTX1, CX32, gap junction protein beta 1
- External IDs: OMIM: 304040; MGI: 95719; GeneCards: GJB1
Available structures
PDB	Ortholog search: PDBe RCSB
PDB	List of PDB id codes 1TXH

Gene location (Human)
Chr.	X chromosome (human)
Band	Xq13.1	Start	71,212,811 bp
Band	Xq13.1	End	71,225,516 bp

Gene location (Mouse)
Chr.	X chromosome (mouse)
Band	X D|X 44.06 cM	Start	100,419,984 bp
Band	X D|X 44.06 cM	End	100,429,235 bp
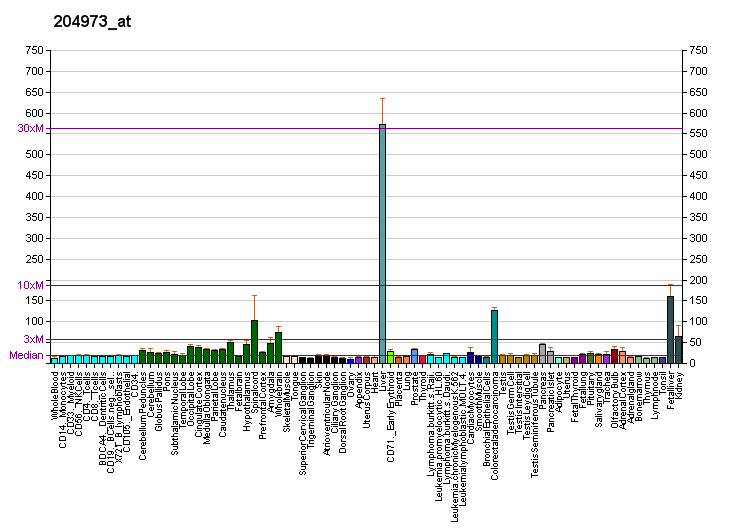
RNA expression pattern
Bgee	Human / Mouse (ortholog); Top expressed in: right lobe of liver; C1 segment; body of pancreas; mucosa of transverse colon; inferior ganglion of vagus nerve; gallbladder; olfactory bulb; subthalamic nucleus; substantia nigra; inferior olivary nucleus / Top expressed in: left lobe of liver; pyloric antrum; parotid gland; gastric mucosa; epithelium of stomach; lumbar subsegment of spinal cord; mucous cell of stomach; yolk sac; lacrimal gland; right kidney; More reference expression data
BioGPS	More reference expression data
Gene ontology
Molecular function	protein homodimerization activity; gap junction channel activity
Cellular component	cytoplasm; integral component of membrane; gap junction; cell junction; plasma membrane; connexin complex; endoplasmic reticulum membrane; endoplasmic reticulum; membrane; lateral plasma membrane
Biological process	purine ribonucleotide transport; gap junction assembly; cell-cell signaling; cell communication; protein complex oligomerization; transmembrane transport; nervous system development; epididymis development
Sources:Amigo / QuickGO
Orthologs
Databases	NCBI: entry; OMA: entry
Species	Human	Mouse
Entrez	2705	14618
Ensembl	ENSG00000169562	ENSMUSG00000047797
UniProt	P08034	P28230
RefSeq (mRNA)	NM_000166; NM_001097642	NM_008124; NM_001302496; NM_001302497; NM_001302498
RefSeq (protein)	NP_000157; NP_001091111	NP_001289425; NP_001289426; NP_001289427; NP_032150
Location (UCSC)	Chr X: 71.21 – 71.23 Mb	Chr X: 100.42 – 100.43 Mb
PubMed search
- Wikidata
View/Edit Human	View/Edit Mouse

Gap junction beta-1 protein (GJB1), also known as connexin 32 (Cx32), is a transmembrane protein that in humans is encoded by the GJB1 gene. (Note: Note on nomenclature: The abbreviation "GJB1" is used to refer to both the GJB1 gene (italicized) and the protein. In this article, "GJB1" (not italicized) refers to the protein and GJB1 (italicized) to the gene) Gap junction beta-1 protein is a member of the gap junction connexin family of proteins that regulates and controls the transfer of communication signals across cell membranes, primarily in the liver and peripheral nervous system. However, the protein is expressed in multiple organs, including in oligodendrocytes in the central nervous system.

Mutations of the GJB1 gene affecting the signalling of and trafficking through gap junctions, resulting in an inherited peripheral neuropathy called X-linked Charcot-Marie-Tooth Disease. Complications include the demyelination of oligodendrocytes and Schwann cells, causing delayed transmission rates of nerve communication in the peripheral nervous system, due to irregularities in the normal function of the cells. This condition leads to a number of symptoms, most commonly muscle weakness and sensory problems in the outer extremities of the limbs. As a result, muscle atrophy and soft tissue injuries due to delayed nerve transmission can occur. In males, due to the hemizygousity of the X-chromosome, the symptoms and issues surrounding X-linked Charcot-Marie-Tooth disease are more prevalent.

== Function ==
Connexins are membrane-spanning proteins that assemble to form gap junction channels that facilitate the transfer of ions and small molecules between cells. For a general discussion of connexin proteins, see GJB2. In Schwann cells, GJB1 also forms channels that facilitate transfers between layers of the myelin.

In melanocytic cells GJB1 gene expression may be regulated by MITF.

== Gene ==
The gene that encodes the human GJB1 protein is found on the X chromosome, on the long arm at position q13.1, in interval 8, from base pair 71,215,212 to base pair 71,225,215.

=== Mutations ===
Approximately four hundred mutations within the GJB1 gene have been identified as causing type X Charcot-Marie-Tooth disease, and it is the only gene known to be associated with this disease. The majority of these mutations only change a single amino acid within the protein chain, which result in a different protein being produced. Mutations within the GJB1 gene consist of novel, missense, double-missense, amino acid deletion, nonsense, frameshift, and in-frame deletions/insertions. These mutations most commonly result in proteins that work incorrectly, less effectively, degrade faster, are not present in adequate numbers or may not function at all.

== Structure ==
The GJB1 gene is approximately 10kb in length, with one coding exon and three non-coding exons. GJB1 is a gap junction, beta 1 protein also identified as connexin 32, with 238 amino acids. This protein contains four transmembrane domains, which when assembled form gap junctions. Each of these gap junctions consist of two hemichannels (connexions), which in turn consist of six connexin molecules (gap junction trans-membrane proteins)., A picture of a connexin and its connexons, showing the two hemichannels, is available here: https://commons.wikimedia.org/wiki/File:Connexon_and_connexin_structure.svg. This enables communication between Schwann cell nuclei and axons through a radial diffusion pathway. As noted above, channels also form between layers of myelin.

== Function ==
GJB1 functions as a radial diffusion pathway, allowing the communication and diffusion of nutrients, ions and small molecules between cells, and between layers of myelin. The GJB1 protein is found in a number of organs, including the liver, kidney, pancreas and nervous system. In normal circumstances this protein is located in the cell membrane of Schwann cells and oligodendrocytes, specialised cells of the nervous system. These cells typically encapsulate nerves and are involved in the assembly and preservation of myelin, which serves to ensure reliable and rapid transmission of nerve signals. Typically the GJB1 protein forms channels between cells as well as through myelin to the internal Schwann cell or oligodendrocyte, allowing effective transportation and communication.

== Type X Charcot-Marie-Tooth disease ==
Mutations in the GJB1 gene can lead to a variety of changes in the Connexin 32 protein or its expression, as compared to the wild type gene. Pathogenic mutations in the gene affect signalling and trafficking of small molecules through gap junctions, resulting in disease - most notably an inherited peripheral neuropathy known as Charcot-Marie-Tooth disease, also often referred to as CMT. Despite the name, CMT does not affect the teeth; the word "tooth" refers to the name of one of the doctors who were important to its discovery. Because GJB1 is located on the X chromosome, GJB1 disease is a type of "X-linked" CMT. Multiple X-linked CMTs have now been identified, and GJB1 disease is referred to as CMT1X or CMTX1. The disease process involves demyelination of nerves due to impact on the Schwann cells, causing delayed transmission rates of nerve communication in the peripheral nervous system, due to irregularities in the normal function of the cells. In addition, impact on axons has been noted, While it was originally believed that axon impact was secondary to demyelination, findings in mice suggest that axon slowing may occur independent from and precede demyelination in CMT1X, due to disturbed signalling between axons and glia as well as disturbances in glial support to axons.

Unlike many other types of CMT, CMT1X is known to cause effects in the central nervous system ("CNS") as well as the peripheral nervous system. However, it is believed that whether or not an individual experiences CNS effects may depend upon the specific mutation involved, and the more precise shape and function of the mutant protein in question, as some mutant GJB1 proteins have much more functionality than others.

This condition leads to a number of symptoms, most commonly muscle weakness and sensory problems in the outer extremities of the limbs. As a result, muscle atrophy and soft tissue injuries due to delayed nerve transmission can occur. In males, due to the hemizygosity of the X-chromosome, the symptoms and issues surrounding X-linked Charcot-Marie-Tooth disease are more prevalent.

Approximately four hundred mutations of the GJB1 gene have been identified in people with X-linked Charcot-Marie-Tooth disease (CMTX). CMTX is predominantly classified with symptoms related to muscle weakness and sensory problems, especially in the outer extremities of the limbs. CMTX is the second most common type of CMT (about 10% of all patients) and is transmitted as an x-linked dominant trait. It is categorised by the lack of male-to-male transmission of the mutated GJB1 gene and the differences in severity between heterozygous women and hemizygous men, with the later being more severely affected.

Most of the mutations of the GJB1 gene switch or change a single amino acid in the gap junction (connexin-32) protein, although some may result in a protein of irregular size. Some of these mutations also cause hearing loss in patients with CMTX. Currently it is unknown how the mutations of the GJB1 gene lead to these specific features of Charcot-Marie-Tooth disease, however it is theorised that the cause is due to the demyelination of nerve cells. As a result, transmission rates of nerve communication in the peripheral nervous system are delayed, which in turn would cause irregularities in the normal function of Schwann cells.

Whilst CMTX is more commonly known to affect the peripheral nervous system some cases have been reported in which there is evidence of demyelination of the central nervous system. These abnormalities whilst not presenting any symptoms were identified through nerve impulse and imaging studies, and are believed to also be caused through mutations on the GJB1 gene.

=== Diagnosis/testing ===
Historically CMTX could only be diagnosed through symptoms or measurement of the speed of nerve impulses. With the creation of genetic testing, 90% of CMTX cases are now diagnosed using the mutations of the GJB1 (Cx32) gene. The genetic screening of families has also become common after the diagnosis of CMTX in a patient, to further identify other family members that may be suffering from the disease. This screening is also used systematically by researchers to identify new mutations within the gene.

=== Management ===
Currently CMTX is an incurable condition, instead patients are evaluated and treated for symptoms caused by the disease. Treatment is limited to rehabilitative therapy, use of assistive devices such as orthoses and in some cases surgical treatment of skeletal deformities and soft-tissue abnormalities. Surgical treatment most commonly includes osteotomies, soft-tissue surgery (including tendon transfers) and/or joint fusions.

=== Genetic counseling ===
Due to the nature of inheritance of CMTX, affected males will pass the GJB1 gene mutation to all female children and none of their male children, whilst females who are carriers will have a 50% chance of passing on the mutation to each of their offspring. With the development of genetic testing, it is possible to perform both prenatal and pre-implantation testing elected by the patient, when their type of mutation has been identified. Results from genetic testing can then be used to prevent the transmission of this disease to their offspring.

== See also ==
- Connexin
- Gap junction
