= GJB7 =

Protein-coding gene in the species Homo sapiens

Identifiers
- Aliases: GJB7, CX25, bA136M9.1, connexin25, gap junction protein beta 7
- External IDs: OMIM: 611921; HomoloGene: 89311; GeneCards: GJB7; OMA:GJB7 - orthologs

Gene location (Human)
Chr.	Chromosome 6 (human)
Band	6q14.3-q15	Start	87,282,980 bp
Band	6q14.3-q15	End	87,329,278 bp
RNA expression pattern
Bgee	Human / Mouse (ortholog); Top expressed in: gonad; right uterine tube; testicle; placenta; pituitary gland; anterior pituitary; olfactory zone of nasal mucosa; right lung; bone marrow; mucosa of transverse colon / n/a; More reference expression data
BioGPS	n/a
Gene ontology
Molecular function	gap junction channel activity
Cellular component	integral component of membrane; gap junction; cell junction; plasma membrane; connexin complex; membrane
Biological process	cell communication; transmembrane transport
Sources:Amigo / QuickGO
Orthologs
Species	Human	Mouse
Entrez	375519	n/a
Ensembl	ENSG00000164411	n/a
UniProt	Q6PEY0	n/a
RefSeq (mRNA)	NM_198568	n/a
RefSeq (protein)	NP_940970	n/a
Location (UCSC)	Chr 6: 87.28 – 87.33 Mb	n/a
PubMed search		n/a
- Wikidata
View/Edit Human

Gap junction beta-7 protein (GJB7), also known as connexin-25 (Cx25), is a protein that in humans is encoded by the GJB7 gene.

== Function ==
Connexins, such as GJB7, are involved in the formation of gap junctions, intercellular conduits that directly connect the cytoplasms of contacting cells. Each gap junction channel is formed by docking of 2 hemichannels, each of which contains 6 connexin subunits.
