= GJA8 =

Protein-coding gene in humans

Identifiers
- Aliases: GJA8, CAE, CAE1, CTRCT1, CX50, CZP1, MP70, gap junction protein alpha 8
- External IDs: OMIM: 600897; MGI: 99953; GeneCards: GJA8

Gene location (Human)
Chr.	Chromosome 1 (human)
Band	1q21.2	Start	147,902,795 bp
Band	1q21.2	End	147,909,269 bp

Gene location (Mouse)
Chr.	Chromosome 3 (mouse)
Band	3 F2.1|3	Start	96,820,882 bp
Band	3 F2.1|3	End	96,833,336 bp
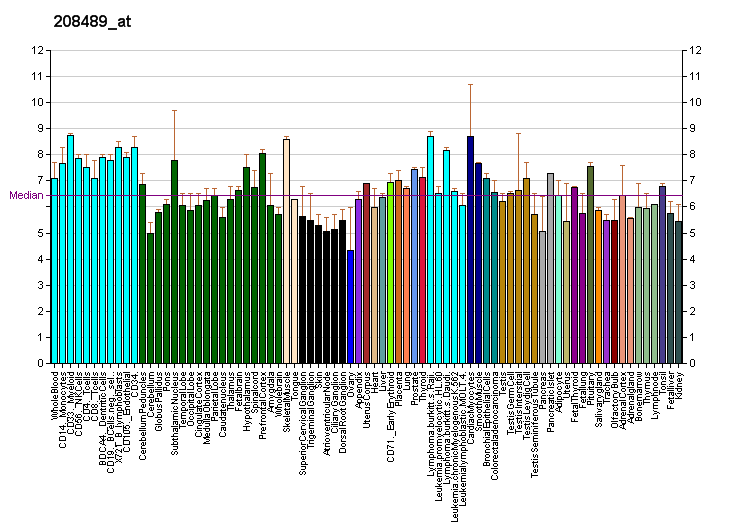
RNA expression pattern
Bgee	Human / Mouse (ortholog); Top expressed in: left testis; right testis; muscle tissue; kidney; human kidney; connective tissue; smooth muscle tissue; adipose tissue; right lobe of liver; viscus / Top expressed in: lens; epithelium of lens; neural layer of retina; tail of embryo; sternocleidomastoid muscle; More reference expression data
BioGPS	More reference expression data
Gene ontology
Molecular function	channel activity; gap junction channel activity
Cellular component	integral component of membrane; gap junction; cell junction; plasma membrane; integral component of plasma membrane; connexin complex; membrane
Biological process	cell communication; cell-cell signaling; camera-type eye development; lens development in camera-type eye; protein homooligomerization; transmembrane transport; visual perception; gap junction-mediated intercellular transport
Sources:Amigo / QuickGO
Orthologs
Databases	NCBI: entry; OMA: entry
Species	Human	Mouse
Entrez	2703	14616
Ensembl	ENSG00000121634	ENSMUSG00000049908
UniProt	P48165	P28236
RefSeq (mRNA)	NM_005267	NM_008123
RefSeq (protein)	NP_005258	NP_032149
Location (UCSC)	Chr 1: 147.9 – 147.91 Mb	Chr 3: 96.82 – 96.83 Mb
PubMed search
- Wikidata
View/Edit Human	View/Edit Mouse

Connexin50

Identifiers
- Symbol: Connexin50
- Pfam: PF03509
- InterPro: IPR002266
Available protein structures:
- PDB: IPR002266 PF03509 (ECOD; PDBsum)
- AlphaFold: IPR002266; PF03509

Gap junction alpha-8 protein is a protein that in humans is encoded by the GJA8 gene. It is also known as connexin 50.

== Related gene problems ==
- 1q21.1 deletion syndrome
- 1q21.1 duplication syndrome
- microphthalmia and other vision pathologies

== Interactions ==
GJA8 has been shown to interact with Tight junction protein 1.
