= GJB3 =

Mammalian protein found in humans

Identifiers
- Aliases: GJB3, CX31, DFNA2, DFNA2B, EKV, gap junction protein beta 3, EKVP1
- External IDs: MGI: 95721; GeneCards: GJB3

Gene location (Human)
Chr.	Chromosome 1 (human)
Band	1p34.3	Start	34,781,214 bp
Band	1p34.3	End	34,786,369 bp

Gene location (Mouse)
Chr.	Chromosome 4 (mouse)
Band	4 D2.2|4 61.48 cM	Start	127,219,028 bp
Band	4 D2.2|4 61.48 cM	End	127,224,637 bp
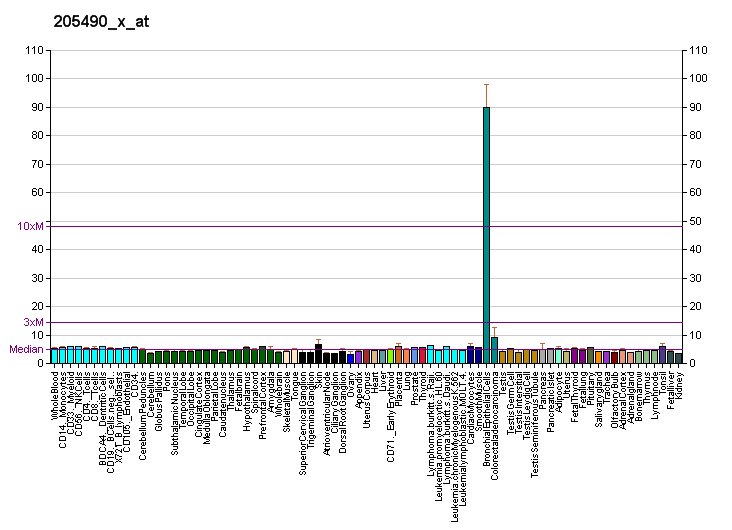

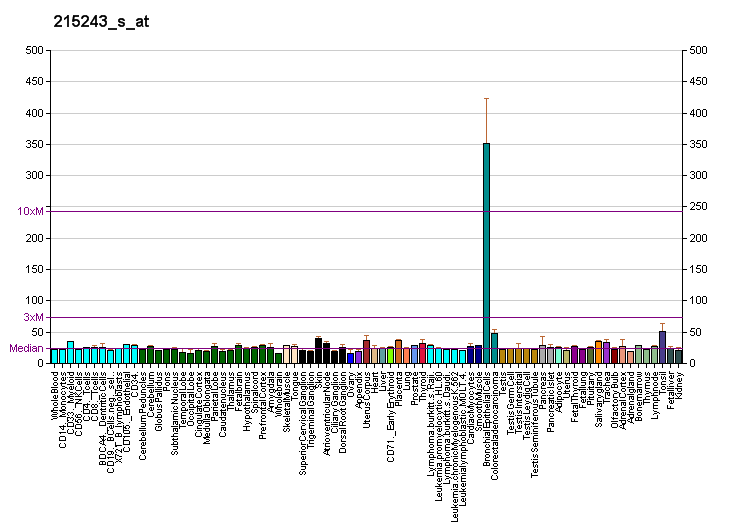

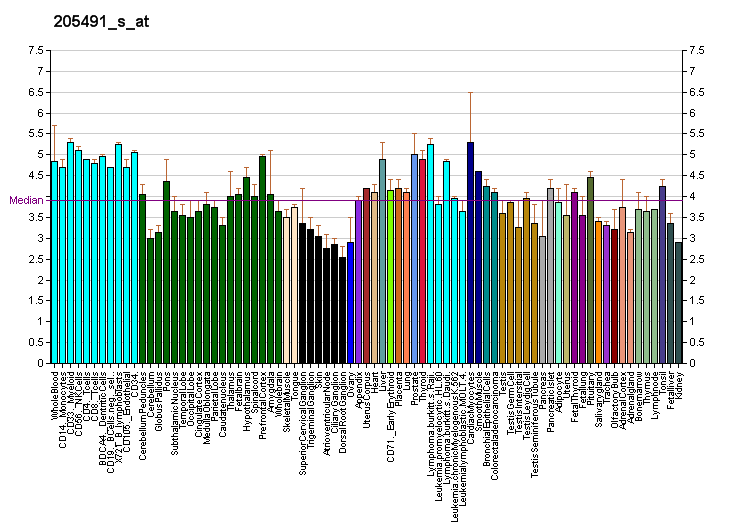
RNA expression pattern
Bgee	Human / Mouse (ortholog); Top expressed in: skin of abdomen; skin of limb; skin of leg; skin of arm; skin of thigh; gingival epithelium; vulva; cervix epithelium; nipple; oral cavity / Top expressed in: lip; blastocyst; skin of external ear; corneal stroma; left colon; esophagus; skin of back; hair follicle; skin of abdomen; morula; More reference expression data
BioGPS	More reference expression data
Gene ontology
Molecular function	gap junction channel activity
Cellular component	cytoplasm; integral component of membrane; gap junction; plasma membrane; connexin complex; membrane; cell-cell junction; cell junction; intracellular membrane-bounded organelle
Biological process	cell communication; in utero embryonic development; skin development; placenta development; transmembrane transport; spermatogenesis; cellular response to retinoic acid
Sources:Amigo / QuickGO
Orthologs
Databases	NCBI: entry; OMA: entry
Species	Human	Mouse
Entrez	2707	14620
Ensembl	ENSG00000188910	ENSMUSG00000042367
UniProt	O75712	P28231
RefSeq (mRNA)	NM_024009; NM_001005752	NM_001160012; NM_008126
RefSeq (protein)	NP_001005752; NP_076872	NP_001153484; NP_032152
Location (UCSC)	Chr 1: 34.78 – 34.79 Mb	Chr 4: 127.22 – 127.22 Mb
PubMed search
- Wikidata
View/Edit Human	View/Edit Mouse

Gap junction beta-3 protein (GJB3), also known as connexin 31 (Cx31), is a protein that in humans is encoded by the GJB3 gene.

== Function ==
This gene is a member of the connexin gene family. The encoded protein is a component of gap junctions, which are composed of arrays of intercellular channels that provide a route for the diffusion of low molecular weight materials from cell to cell. Mutations in this gene can cause non-syndromic deafness or erythrokeratodermia variabilis, a skin disorder. Alternative splicing results in multiple transcript variants encoding the same protein.
