= Innexin =

Transmembrane protein in invertebrates

Identifiers
- Symbol: Innexin
- Pfam: PF00876
- InterPro: IPR000990
- TCDB: 1.A.25
- OPM superfamily: 194
- OPM protein: 5h1r
Available protein structures:
- PDB: IPR000990 PF00876 (ECOD; PDBsum)
- AlphaFold: IPR000990; PF00876

Innexins are transmembrane proteins that form gap junctions in invertebrates. Gap junctions are composed of membrane proteins that form a channel permeable to ions and small molecules connecting the cytoplasm of adjacent cells. Although gap junctions provide similar functions in all multicellular organisms, it was not known what proteins invertebrates used for this purpose until the late 1990s. While the connexin family of gap junction proteins was well-characterized in vertebrates, no homologues were found in non-chordates.

Innexins or related proteins are widespread among Eumetazoa, with the exception of echinoderms.

== Discovery ==
Gap junction proteins with no sequence homology to connexins were initially identified in fruit flies. It was suggested that these proteins are specific invertebrate gap junctions, and they were thus named "innexins" (invertebrate analog of connexins). They were later identified in diverse invertebrates. Invertebrate genomes may contain more than a dozen innexin genes. Once the human genome was sequenced, innexin homologues were identified in humans and then in other vertebrates, indicating their ubiquitous distribution in the animal kingdom. These homologues were called "pannexins" (from the Greek pan - all, throughout, and Latin nexus - connection, bond). However, increasing evidence suggests that pannexins do not form gap junctions unless overexpressed in tissue and thus, differ functionally from innexins.

== Structure ==
Innexins have four transmembrane segments (TMSs) and, like the vertebrate connexin gap junction protein, innexin subunits together form a channel (an "innexon") in the plasma membrane of the cell. Two innexons in apposed plasma membranes can form a gap junction channel. Innexons are made from eight subunits, instead of the six subunits of connexons. Structurally, innexins and connexins are very similar, consisting of 4 transmembrane domains, 2 extracellular and 1 intracellular loop, along with intracellular N- and C-terminal tails. Despite this shared topology, the protein families do not share enough sequence similarity to confidently infer common ancestry.

Pannexins are similar to innexins and are usually considered a sub-group, but they do not participate in the formation of gap junctions and the channels have seven subunits.

Vinnexins, viral homologues of innexins, were identified in polydnaviruses that occur in obligate symbiotic associations with parasitoid wasps. It was suggested that vinnexins may function to alter gap junction proteins in infected host cells, possibly modifying cell-cell communication during encapsulation responses in parasitized insects.

== Function ==
Innexins form gap junctions found in invertebrates. They also form non-junctional membrane channels with properties similar to those of pannexons. N-terminal- elongated innexins can act as a plug to manipulate hemichannel closure and provide a mechanism connecting the effect of hemichannel closure directly to apoptotic signal transduction from the intracellular to the extracellular compartment.

The vertebrate homolog pannexin do not form gap junctions. They only form the hemichannel "pannexons". These hemichannels can be present in plasma, ER and Golgi membranes. They transport Ca^{2+}, ATP, inositol triphosphate and other small molecules and can form hemichannels with greater ease than connexin subunits.

=== Transport reaction ===
The transport reactions catalyzed by innexin gap junctions is:

Small molecules (cell 1 cytoplasm) ⇌ small molecules (cell 2 cytoplasm)

Or for hemichannels:

Small molecules (cell cytoplasm) ⇌ small molecules (out)

== Examples ==
- Caenorhabditis elegans
  - unc-7
  - unc-9
  - inx-3
- Drosophila melanogaster
  - Inx2
  - Inx3
  - Inx4 (zero population growth, zpg)
  - Ogre
  - shaking-B
- Hirudo medicinalis
  - Hm-inx1
  - Hm-inx2
  - Hm-inx3
  - Hm-inx6

== See also ==
- connexin
- pannexin
