= GJA3 =

Protein-coding gene in the species Homo sapiens

Identifiers
- Aliases: GJA3, CTRCT14, CX46, CZP3, gap junction protein alpha 3
- External IDs: OMIM: 121015; MGI: 95714; GeneCards: GJA3

Gene location (Human)
Chr.	Chromosome 13 (human)
Band	13q12.11	Start	20,138,255 bp
Band	13q12.11	End	20,161,052 bp

Gene location (Mouse)
Chr.	Chromosome 14 (mouse)
Band	14 C3|14 29.82 cM	Start	57,271,917 bp
Band	14 C3|14 29.82 cM	End	57,295,557 bp
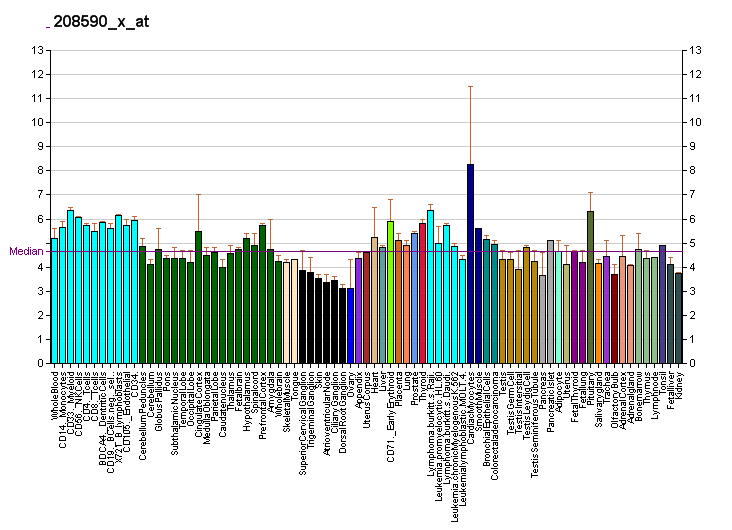
RNA expression pattern
Bgee	Human / Mouse (ortholog); Top expressed in: myocardium of left ventricle; right ventricle; tendon of biceps brachii; testicle; apex of heart; right atrium; right auricle of heart; secondary oocyte; right coronary artery; islet of Langerhans / Top expressed in: epithelium of lens; renal corpuscle; atrioventricular valve; hair follicle; aortic valve; atrium; embryo; myocardium of ventricle; ciliary body; lip; More reference expression data
BioGPS	More reference expression data
Gene ontology
Molecular function	gap junction channel activity
Cellular component	integral component of membrane; gap junction; cell junction; plasma membrane; connexin complex; membrane
Biological process	cell communication; cell-cell signaling; transmembrane transport; visual perception
Sources:Amigo / QuickGO
Orthologs
Databases	NCBI: entry; OMA: entry
Species	Human	Mouse
Entrez	2700	14611
Ensembl	ENSG00000121743	ENSMUSG00000048582
UniProt	Q9Y6H8	Q64448
RefSeq (mRNA)	NM_021954	NM_001271623; NM_016975
RefSeq (protein)	NP_068773	NP_001258552; NP_058671
Location (UCSC)	Chr 13: 20.14 – 20.16 Mb	Chr 14: 57.27 – 57.3 Mb
PubMed search
- Wikidata
View/Edit Human	View/Edit Mouse

Gap junction alpha-3 protein is a protein that in humans is encoded by the GJA3 gene.

== Interactions ==
GJA3 has been shown to interact with Tight junction protein 1.
