= Pannexin =

Identifiers
- Symbol: Pannexin
- InterPro: IPR039099
- TCDB: 1.A.25
Available protein structures:
- PDB: IPR039099
- AlphaFold: IPR039099

pannexin 1

Identifiers
- Symbol: PANX1
- NCBI gene: 24145
- HGNC: 8599
- OMIM: 608420
- RefSeq: NM_015368
- UniProt: Q96RD7

Other data
- Locus: Chr. 11 q14-q21
Search for
- Structures: Swiss-model
- Domains: InterPro

pannexin 2

Identifiers
- Symbol: PANX2
- NCBI gene: 56666
- HGNC: 8600
- OMIM: 608421
- RefSeq: NM_052839
- UniProt: Q96RD6

Other data
- Locus: Chr. 22 q13
Search for
- Structures: Swiss-model
- Domains: InterPro

pannexin 3

Identifiers
- Symbol: PANX3
- NCBI gene: 116337
- HGNC: 20573
- OMIM: 608422
- RefSeq: NM_052959
- UniProt: Q96QZ0

Other data
- Locus: Chr. 11 q24.2
Search for
- Structures: Swiss-model
- Domains: InterPro

Pannexins (from Greek 'παν' — all, and from Latin 'nexus' — connection) are a family of vertebrate proteins identified by their homology to the invertebrate innexins. While innexins are responsible for forming gap junctions in invertebrates, the pannexins have been shown to predominantly exist as large transmembrane channels connecting the intracellular and extracellular space, allowing the passage of ions and small molecules between these compartments (such as ATP and sulforhodamine B).

Three pannexins have been described in Chordates: Panx1, Panx2 and Panx3.

== Function ==
Pannexins can form nonjunctional transmembrane channels for transport of molecules of less than 1000 Da. These hemichannels can be present in plasma, endoplasmic reticulum (ER) and Golgi membranes. They transport Ca^{2+}, ATP, inositol triphosphate and other small molecules and can form hemichannels with greater ease than connexin subunits. Pannexin 1 and pannexin 2 underlie channel function in neurons and contribute to ischemic brain damage.

Pannexin 1 has been shown to be involved in early stages of innate immunity through an interaction with the P2X7 purinergic receptor. Activation of the pannexin channel through binding of ATP to P2X7 receptor leads to the release of interleukin-1β.

Hypothetical roles of pannexins in the nervous system include participating in sensory processing, synchronization between hippocampus and cortex, hippocampal plasticity, and propagation of calcium waves. Calcium waves are supported by glial cells, which help maintain and modulate neuronal metabolism. According to one of the hypotheses, pannexins also may participate in pathological reactions, including the neural damage after ischemia and subsequent cell death.

Pannexin 1 channels are pathways for release of ATP from cells.

== Relationship to connexins ==
Intercellular gap junctions in vertebrates, including humans, are formed by the connexin family of proteins. Structurally, pannexins and connexins are very similar, consisting of 4 transmembrane domains, 2 extracellular and 1 intracellular loop, along with intracellular N- and C-terminal tails. Despite this shared topology, the protein families do not share enough sequence similarity to confidently infer common ancestry.

The N-terminal portion (Pfam PF12534) of VRAC-forming LRRC8 proteins like LRRC8A may also be related to pannexins.

The structure of a Xenopus tropicalis (western clawed frog) pannexin (PDB: 6VD7) has been solved. It forms a heptameric disc. The human version (PDB: 6M02) is similar.

== Clinical significance ==
Truncating mutations in pannexin 1 have been shown to promote breast and colon cancer metastasis to the lungs by allowing cancer cells to survive mechanical stretch in the microcirculation through the release of ATP.

Pannexins may be involved in the process of tumor development. Particularly, PANX2 expression levels predict post diagnosis survival for patients with glial tumors.

Probenecid, a well-established drug for the treatment of gout, allows for discrimination between channels formed by connexins and pannexins. Probenecid does not affect channels formed by connexins, but it inhibits pannexin-1 channels.
