= GJD2 =

Protein-coding gene in the species Homo sapiens

Available structures
| PDB | Ortholog search: PDBe RCSB |
| PDB | List of PDB id codes 2N6A |

Identifiers
- Aliases: GJD2, CX36, GJA9, gap junction protein delta 2
- External IDs: OMIM: 607058; MGI: 1334209; HomoloGene: 7734; GeneCards: GJD2; OMA:GJD2 - orthologs

Gene location (Human)
| Chr. | Chromosome 15 (human) |
| Band | 15q14 | Start | 34,751,032 bp |
| Band | 15q14 | End | 34,754,998 bp |

Gene location (Mouse)
| Chr. | Chromosome 2 (mouse) |
| Band | 2|2 E4 | Start | 113,840,082 bp |
| Band | 2|2 E4 | End | 113,844,100 bp |
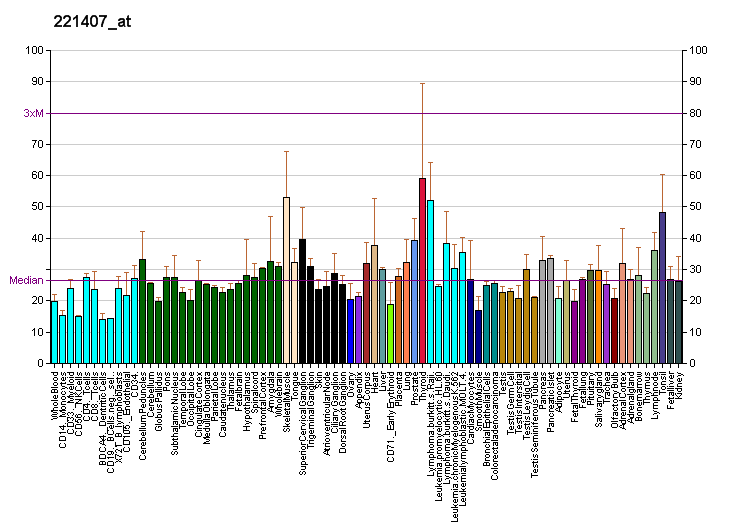
RNA expression pattern
| Bgee | Human / Mouse (ortholog); Top expressed in: islet of Langerhans; gonad; pituitary gland; anterior pituitary; prefrontal cortex; right auricle of heart; body of pancreas; occipital lobe; dorsolateral prefrontal cortex; Brodmann area 9 / Top expressed in: thoracic ganglia; islet of Langerhans; neural layer of retina; lumbar subsegment of spinal cord; stellate ganglion; anterior horn of spinal cord; facial motor nucleus; pineal gland; olfactory bulb; retinal pigment epithelium; More reference expression data |
| BioGPS | More reference expression data |
Gene ontology
| Molecular function | gap junction channel activity |
| Cellular component | integral component of membrane; gap junction; cell junction; plasma membrane; connexin complex; membrane |
| Biological process | action potential; cell communication; cell-cell signaling; visual perception; chemical synaptic transmission; transmembrane transport |
Sources:Amigo / QuickGO
Orthologs
| Species | Human | Mouse |
| Entrez | 57369 | 14617 |
| Ensembl | ENSG00000159248 | ENSMUSG00000068615 |
| UniProt | Q9UKL4 | O54851 |
| RefSeq (mRNA) | NM_020660 | NM_010290 |
| RefSeq (protein) | NP_065711 | NP_034420 |
| Location (UCSC) | Chr 15: 34.75 – 34.75 Mb | Chr 2: 113.84 – 113.84 Mb |
| PubMed search |
- Wikidata
| View/Edit Human | View/Edit Mouse |

Gap junction delta-2 protein (GJD2), also known as connexin-36 (Cx36) or gap junction alpha-9 protein (GJA9), is a protein that in humans is encoded by the GJD2 gene.

== Function ==
GJD2, also called connexin-36 (CX36), is a member of the connexin gene family that is expressed predominantly in mammalian neurons. Connexins associate in groups of 6 and are organized radially around a central pore to form connexons. Each gap junction intercellular channel is formed by the conjunction of 2 connexons. See GJB2 for additional background information on connexins.
