= GJB4 =

Protein found in humans

Identifiers
- Aliases: GJB4, CX30.3, EKV, gap junction protein beta 4, EKVP2
- External IDs: OMIM: 605425; MGI: 95722; GeneCards: GJB4

Gene location (Human)
Chr.	Chromosome 1 (human)
Band	1p34.3	Start	34,759,740 bp
Band	1p34.3	End	34,762,327 bp

Gene location (Mouse)
Chr.	Chromosome 4 (mouse)
Band	4 D2.2|4 61.51 cM	Start	127,244,879 bp
Band	4 D2.2|4 61.51 cM	End	127,247,874 bp
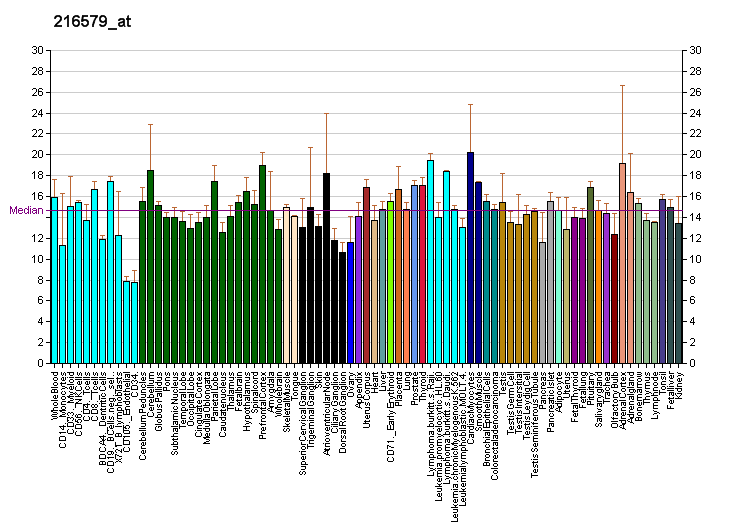
RNA expression pattern
Bgee	Human / Mouse (ortholog); Top expressed in: skin of abdomen; skin of leg; gallbladder; olfactory zone of nasal mucosa; vagina; islet of Langerhans; tonsil; urinary bladder; prostate; minor salivary glands / Top expressed in: lip; esophagus; skin of external ear; skin of back; gastrula; hair follicle; skin of abdomen; embryo; decidua; blastocyst; More reference expression data
BioGPS	More reference expression data
Gene ontology
Molecular function	gap junction channel activity
Cellular component	connexin complex; integral component of membrane; gap junction; plasma membrane; membrane; nucleus; nucleolus; cell junction; integral component of plasma membrane
Biological process	cell communication; sensory perception of smell; olfactory behavior; cell-cell signaling; transmembrane transport; gap junction-mediated intercellular transport
Sources:Amigo / QuickGO
Orthologs
Databases	NCBI: entry; OMA: entry
Species	Human	Mouse
Entrez	127534	14621
Ensembl	ENSG00000189433	ENSMUSG00000046623
UniProt	Q9NTQ9	Q02738
RefSeq (mRNA)	NM_153212	NM_008127
RefSeq (protein)	NP_694944	NP_032153
Location (UCSC)	Chr 1: 34.76 – 34.76 Mb	Chr 4: 127.24 – 127.25 Mb
PubMed search
- Wikidata
View/Edit Human	View/Edit Mouse

Gap junction beta-4 protein (GJB4), also known as connexin 30.3 (Cx30.3), is a protein that in humans is encoded by the GJB4 gene.
