= Gap junction =

Cell-cell junction composed of innexins or connexins

- Cell gap junction

Identifiers
- MeSH: D017629
- TH: H1.00.01.1.02024
- FMA: 67423

Gap junctions are membrane channels between adjacent cells that allow the direct exchange of cytoplasmic substances, such as small molecules, substrates, and metabolites. Gap junctions were first described as close appositions alongside tight junctions, but based on electron microscopy studies, they were later renamed gap junctions to distinguish them from tight junctions. They bridge a 2-4 nm gap between cell membranes.

Gap junctions use protein complexes known as connexons, composed of connexin proteins to connect one cell to another. Gap junction proteins include the more than 26 types of connexin, as well as at least 12 non-connexin components that make up the gap junction complex or nexus, including the tight junction protein ZO-1—a protein that holds membrane content together and adds structural clarity to a cell, sodium channels, and aquaporin.

More gap junction proteins have become known due to the development of next-generation sequencing. Connexins were found to be structurally homologous between vertebrates and invertebrates but different in sequence. As a result, the term innexin is used to differentiate invertebrate connexins. There are more than 20 known innexins, along with unnexins in parasites and vinnexins in viruses.

An electrical synapse is a gap junction that can transmit action potentials between neurons. Such synapses create bidirectional continuous-time electrical coupling between neurons. Connexon pairs act as generalized regulated gates for ions and smaller molecules between cells. Hemichannel connexons form channels to the extracellular environment.

A gap junction is different from an ephaptic coupling that involves electrical signals external to the cells.

== Structure ==
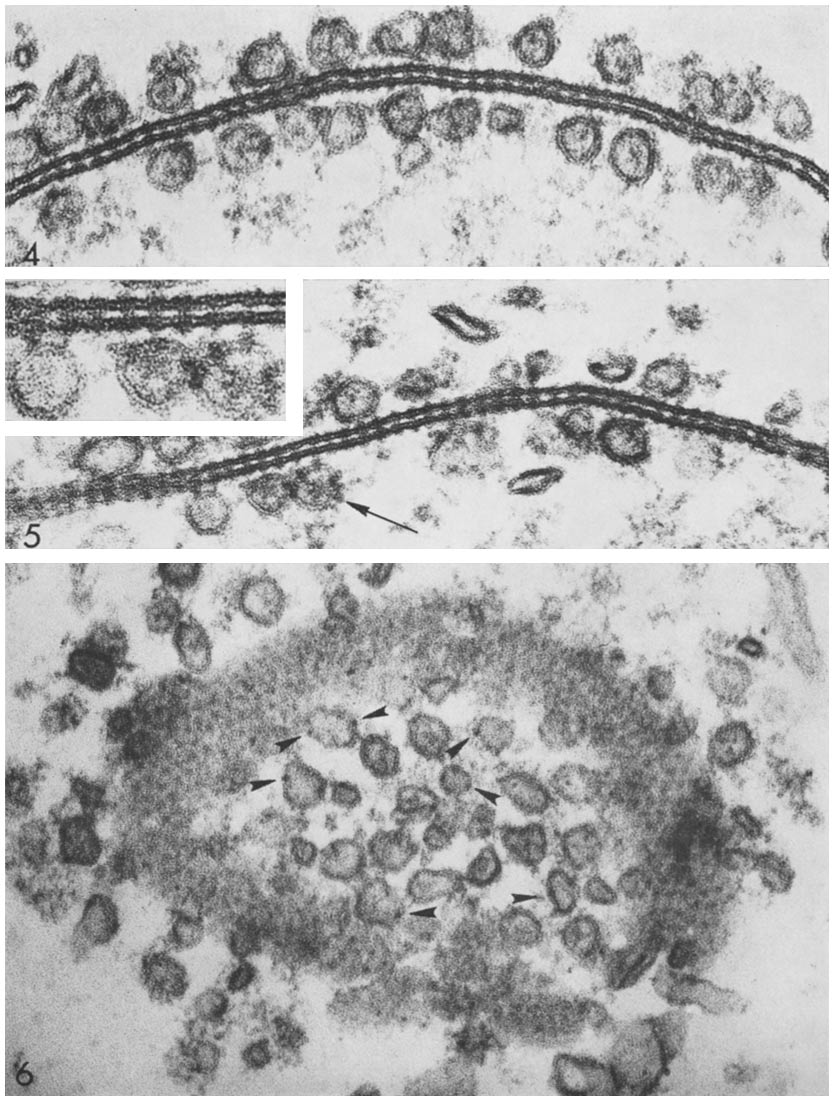
Connexon pairing across membranes bridges the gap between two cells and between vesicles to membranes.

In vertebrates, gap junction hemichannels are primarily homo- or hetero-hexamers of connexin proteins. Hetero-hexamers at gap junction plaques, help form a uniform intercellular space of 2-4 nm. In this way hemichannels in the membrane of each cell are aligned with one another forming an intercellular communication path.

Invertebrate gap junctions comprise proteins from the innexin family. Innexins have no significant sequence homology with connexins. Though differing in sequence to connexins, innexins are similar enough to connexins to form gap junctions in vivo in the same way connexins do.

The more recently characterized pannexin family, which was originally thought to form intercellular channels (with an amino acid sequence similar to innexins) in fact functions as a single-membrane channel that communicates with the extracellular environment and has been shown to pass calcium and ATP. This has led to the idea that pannexins may not form intercellular junctions in the same way connexins and innexins do and therefore should not use the same hemi-channel/channel naming. Others have presented evidence based on genetic sequencing and overall functioning in tissues, that pannexins should still be considered part of the gap junction family of proteins despite structural differences. These researchers also note that there are still more groups of connexin orthologs to be discovered.

Gap junction channels formed from two identical hemichannels are called homotypic, while those with differing hemichannels are heterotypic. In turn, hemichannels of uniform protein composition are called homomeric, while those with differing proteins are heteromeric. Channel composition influences the function of gap junction channels, and different connexins will not necessarily form heterotypic with all others.

Before innexins and connexins were well characterized, the genes coding for the connexin gap junction channels were classified in one of three groups (A, B and C; for example, GJA1, GJC1), based on gene mapping and sequence similarity. However, connexin genes do not code directly for the expression of gap junction channels; genes can produce only the proteins that make up gap junction channels. An alternative naming system based on the protein's molecular weight is the most widely used (for example, connexin43=GJA1, connexin30.3=GJB4).

== Levels of organization ==
In vertebrates, two pairs of six connexin proteins form a connexon. In invertebrates, six innexin proteins form an innexon. Otherwise, the structures are similar.

1. The connexin genes (DNA) are transcribed to RNA, which is then translated to produce a connexin.
2. One connexin protein has four transmembrane domains
3. Six connexin proteins create one connexon channel a hemichannel. When identical connexin proteins join to form one connexon, it is called a homomeric connexon. When different connexin proteins join to form one connexon, it is called a heteromeric connexon.
4. Two connexons, joined across a cell membrane, comprise a gap junction channel.
  When two identical connexons come together to form a gap junction channel, it is called a homotypic channel. When one homomeric connexon and one heteromeric connexon come together, it is called a heterotypic gap junction channel. When two heteromeric connexons join, it is also called a heterotypic gap junction channel.
5. Tens to thousands of gap junction channels cluster in areas to enable connexon pairs to form. The macromolecular complex is called a gap junction plaque. Molecules other than connexins are involved in gap junction plaques including tight junction protein 1 and sodium channels.

== Properties of connexon pairs ==
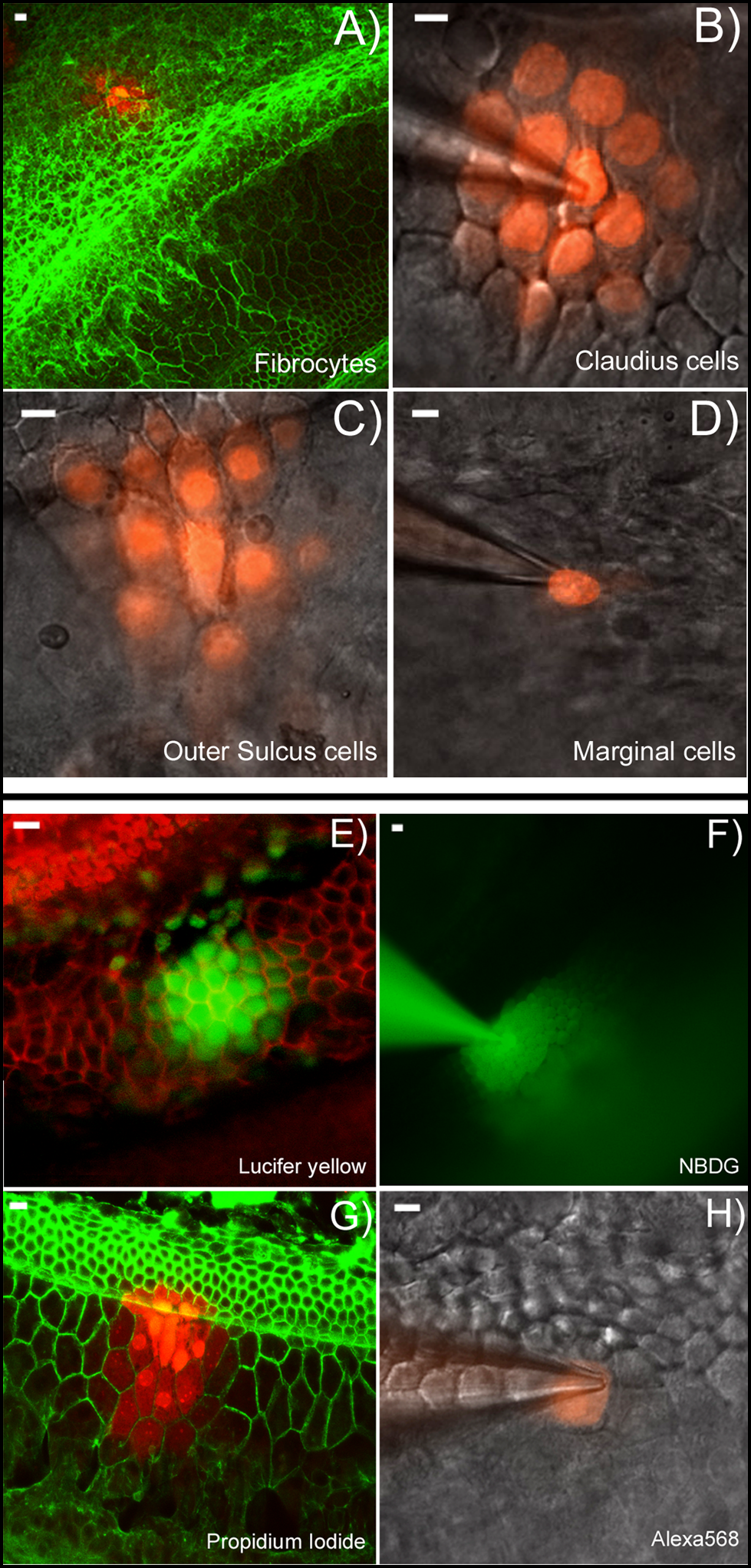
Light microscope images do not allow us to see connexons or innexons themselves but do let us see the fluorescing dye injected into one cell moving into neighboring cells when gap junctions are known to be present.

A connexon or innexon channel pair:

1. Allows for direct electrical communication between cells, although different hemichannel subunits can impart different single channel conductances, from about 30 pS to 500 pS.
2. Allows for chemical communication between cells through the transmission of small second messengers, such as inositol triphosphate (IP_{3}) and calcium (Ca^{2+}), although different hemichannel subunits can impart different selectivities for particular molecules.
3. Generally allows transmembrane movement of molecules smaller than 485 daltons (1,100 daltons through invertebrate gap junctions), although different hemichannel subunits may impart different pore sizes and different charge selectivity. Large biomolecules, including nucleic acids and proteins, are precluded from cytoplasmic transfer between cells through gap junction hemichannel pairs.
4. Ensures that molecules and current passing through the gap junction do not leak into the intercellular space.

== Properties of connexons as hemichannels ==
Unpaired connexons or innexons can act as hemichannels in a single membrane, allowing the cell to exchange molecules directly with the exterior of the cell. It has been shown that connexons would be available to do this prior to being incorporated into the gap junction plaques. Some of the properties of these unpaired connexons are listed below:

1. Pore or transmembrane channel size is highly variable, in the range of approximately 8-20Å in diameter.
2. They connect the cytoplasm of the cell to the cell exterior and are thought to be in a closed state by default in order to prevent leakage from the cell.
3. Some connexons respond to external factors by opening up. Mechanical shear and various diseases can cause this to happen.

Establishing further connexon properties different to those of connexon pairs, proves difficult due to separating their effects experimentally in organisms.

== Occurrence and distribution ==
Gap junctions have been found in nearly all animal cells that touch each other. Techniques such as confocal microscopy allow more rapid surveys of large areas of tissue. Tissues that were traditionally considered to have isolated cells such as in bone were shown to have cells that were still connected with gap junctions, however tenuously. Exceptions to this are cells not normally in contact with neighboring cells, such as blood cells suspended in blood plasma. Adult skeletal muscle is a possible exception to the rule though their large size makes it difficult to be certain of this. An argument used against skeletal muscle gap junctions is that if they were present gap junctions may propagate contractions in an arbitrary way through cells making up the muscle. However, other muscle types do have gap junctions which do not cause arbitrary contractions. Sometimes the number of gap junctions are reduced or absent in diseased tissues such as cancers or the aging process.

Cell pannexin tree with white squares having communication proteins yet to be discovered

Since the discovery of innexins, pannexins and unnexins, gaps in our knowledge of intercellular communication are becoming more defined. Innexins look and behave similarly to connexins and can be seen to fill a similar role to connexins in invertebrates. Pannexins also look individually similar to connexins though they do not appear to easily form gap junctions. Of the over 20 metazoan groups connexins have been found only in vertebrata and tunicata. Innexins and pannexins are far more widespread including innexin homologues in vertebrates. The unicellular Trypanosomatidae parasites presumably have unnexin genes to aid in their infection of animals including humans. The even smaller adenovirus has its own vinnexin, apparently derived from an innexin, to aid its transmission between the virus's insect hosts.

A gap junction cannot be defined by a single protein or family of proteins with a specific function. For example, gap junction structures are found in sponges, without pannexins, but may prove to indicate intercellular communications pathways.

== Functions ==
At least five discrete functions have been ascribed to gap junction proteins:

1. Electrical and metabolic coupling between cells
2. Electrical and metabolic exchange through hemichannels
3. Tumor suppressor or promotion genes (Cx43, Cx32 and Cx36)
4. Adhesive function independent of conductive gap junction channel (neural migration in neocortex)
5. Role of carboxyl-terminal in signaling cytoplasmic pathways (Cx43)

In a more general sense, gap junctions may be seen to function at the simplest level as a direct cell to cell pathway for electrical currents, small molecules and ions. The control of this communication allows complex downstream effects on multicellular organisms.

=== Embryonic, organ and tissue development ===
In the 1980s, more subtle roles of gap junctions in communication have been investigated. It was discovered that gap junction communication could be disrupted by adding anti-connexin antibodies into embryonic cells. Embryos with areas of blocked gap junctions failed to develop normally. The mechanism by which antibodies blocked the gap junctions was unclear; systematic studies were undertaken to elucidate the mechanism. Refinement of these studies suggested that gap junctions were key in the development of cell polarity and the left-right symmetry in animals. While signaling that determines the position of body organs appears to rely on gap junctions, so does the more fundamental differentiation of cells at later stages of embryonic development.

Gap junctions were found to be responsible for the transmission of signals required for drugs to have an effect. Conversely, some drugs were shown to block gap junction channels.

=== The bystander effect and disease ===
==== Cell death ====
The bystander effect has its connotations of the innocent bystander being killed. When cells are dying or compromised due to disease or injury, messages are transmitted to neighboring cells by gap junctions. This can cause otherwise healthy bystander cells to also die.

The bystander effect was later researched with regard to cells damaged by radiation or mechanical injury and in turn wound healing. Disease seems to have an effect on the ability of gap junctions to fulfill their roles in wound healing. The oral administration of gap junction blockers to reduce the symptoms of disease in remote parts of the body is slowly becoming a reality.

==== Tissue restructuring ====
While there has been a tendency to focus on the bystander effect in disease due to the possibility of therapeutic avenues, there is evidence that there is a more central role in normal development of tissues. Death of some cells and their surrounding matrix may be required for a tissue to reach its final configuration; gap junctions appear essential to this process. There are also more complex studies that try to combine our understanding of the simultaneous roles of gap junctions in both wound healing and tissue development.

==== Disease ====
Mutations in connexins have been associated with many diseases in humans, including deafness, heart atrial fibrillation (standstill) and cataracts. The study of these mutations has helped clarify some of the functions of connexins.

Hemichannels are thought to play a general role in the progression and severity of many diseases; this is in part due to hemichannels being an open door to the outside of each cell.

=== Areas of electrical coupling ===
Gap junctions electrically couple cells throughout the body of most animals. Electrical coupling can be relatively fast acting and can be used over short distances within an organism. Tissues in this section have well known functions observed to be coordinated by gap junctions, with intercellular signaling happening in time frames of microseconds or less.

==== Heart ====
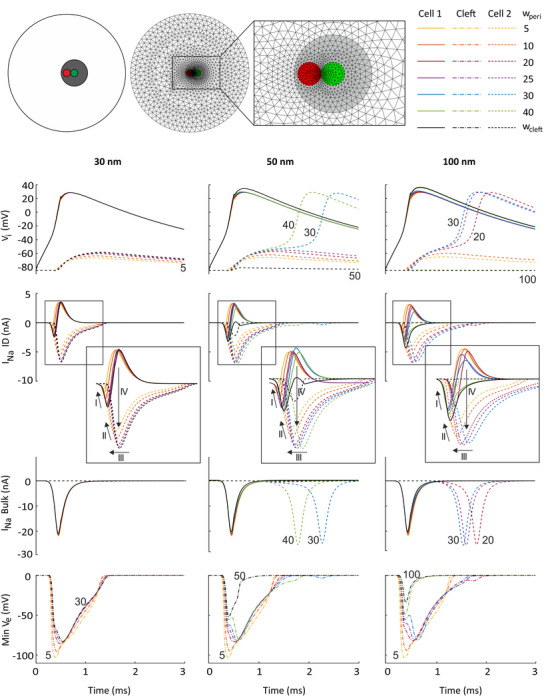
Effects of perinexal width on ephaptic coupling, for G gap = 0 nS

Gap junctions are particularly important in cardiac muscle: the signal to contract is passed efficiently through gap junctions, allowing the heart muscle cells to contract in unison. The importance is emphasized by a secondary ephaptic pathway for the signal to contract also being associated with the gap junction plaques. This redundancy in signal transmission associated with gap junction plaques is the first to be described and involves sodium channels rather than connexins.

==== Eye lens ====
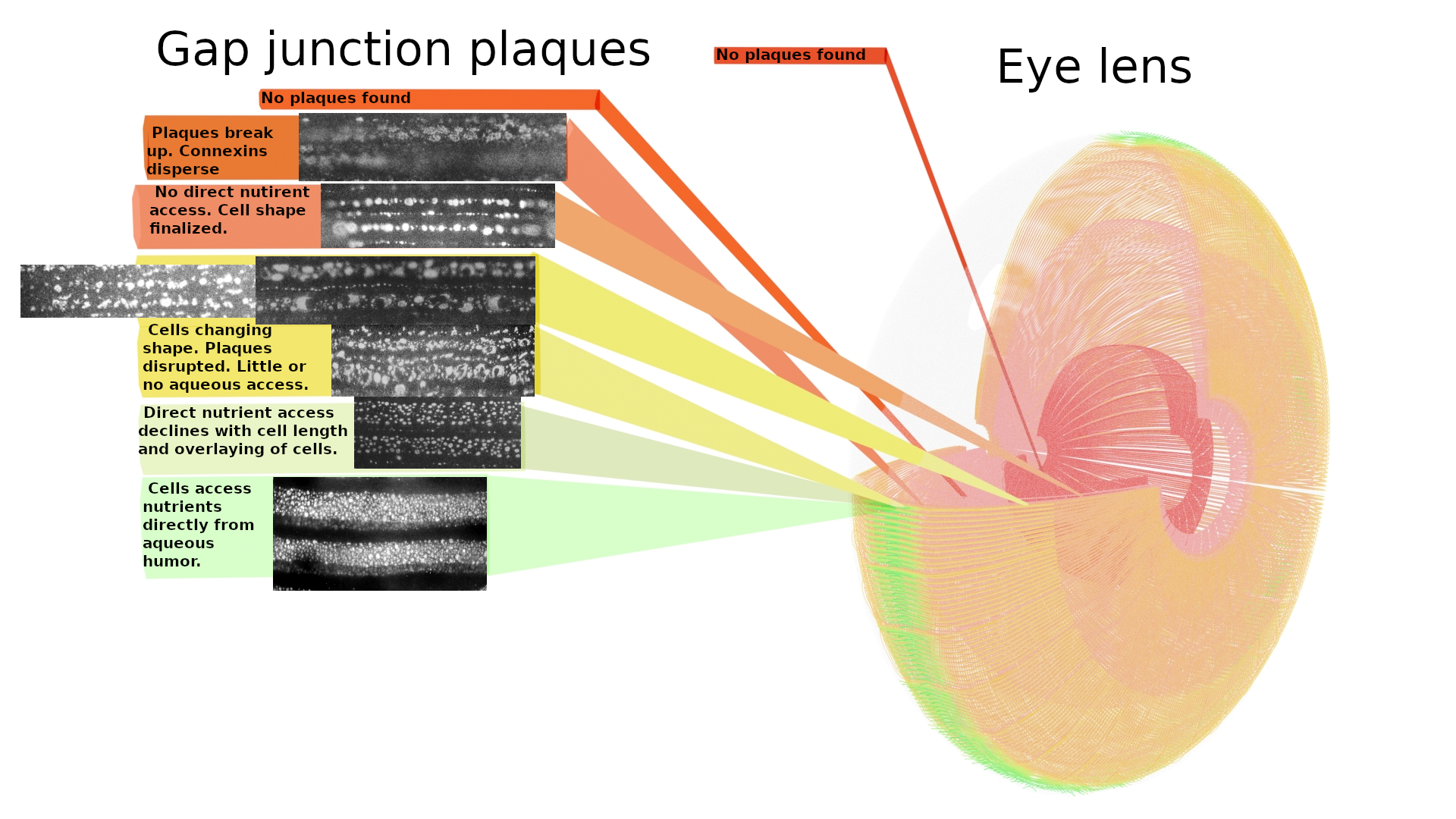
Eye lens showing arrangement of fiber cells with photos of gap junction plaques from different regions

Precise control of light refraction, structural dimensions and transparency are key aspects of the eye lens structure that allow focusing by the eye. Transparency is aided by the absence of nerves and blood vessels from the lens, so gap junctions are left with a larger loading of intercellular communication than in other tissues reflected in large numbers of gap junctions. The crystallinity of the lens also means the cells and gap junctions are well ordered for systematic mapping of where the gap junction plaques are. As no cells are lost from the lens interior during the life of the animal, a complete map of the gap junctions is possible.

The associated figure shows how the size, shape, and frequency of gap junction plaques change with cell growth. With growth, fiber cells are progressively isolated from more direct metabolite exchange with the aqueous humor through the capsule and lens epithelium. The isolation correlates with the classical circular shape of larger plaques shown in the yellow zone being disrupted. Changing the fiber cells' morphology requires the movements of vesicles through the gap junction plaques at higher frequencies in this area.

==== Neurons ====
A gap junction located between neurons is often referred to as an electrical synapse. The electrical synapse was discovered using electrical measurements before the gap junction structure was described. In mammals, electrical synapses are present throughout the central nervous system and have been studied specifically in the neocortex, hippocampus, vestibular nucleus, thalamic reticular nucleus, locus coeruleus, inferior olivary nucleus, mesencephalic nucleus of the trigeminal nerve, ventral tegmental area, olfactory bulb, retina and spinal cord of vertebrates. In invertebrates, gap junctions are known to be expressed widely in the brain of the fruit fly, Drosophila.

There has been some observation of coupling in the locus coeruleus between weak neurons and glial cells and in the cerebellum between Purkinje neurons and Bergmann glial cells. It appears that astrocytes are coupled by gap junctions, both to other astrocytes and to oligodendrocytes. Moreover, mutations in the gap junction genes Cx43 and Cx56.6 cause white matter degeneration similar to that observed in Pelizaeus–Merzbacher disease and multiple sclerosis.

Connexin proteins expressed in neuronal gap junctions include mCX36, mCX57, and mCX45, with mRNAs for at least five other connexins (mCx26, mCx30.2, mCx32, mCx43, mCx47) detected but without immunocytochemical evidence for the corresponding protein within ultrastructurally defined gap junctions. Those mRNAs appear to be downregulated or destroyed by micro interfering RNAs (miRNAs) that are cell-type and cell-lineage specific.

Within the brain of the fruit fly Drosophila, gap junctions are known to be critical for a variety of functions.

Astrocytes

An important feature of astrocytes is their high expression levels of the gap junction proteins connexin 30 (Cx30) and connexin 43 (Cx43). These proteins play crucial roles in regulating brain homeostasis through potassium buffering, intercellular communication, and nutrient transport. Connexins typically form gap junction channels that allow direct intercellular communication between astrocytes. However, they can also form hemichannels that facilitate the exchange of ions and molecules with the extracellular space.

The electrical role of the astrocyte gap junction was identified in 2016. A strong electrical coupling among gap junctionally coupled astrocytes confers an isopotentiality to astrocyte syncytial networks, termed astrocyte syncytial isopotentility. Functionally, syncytial isopotentiality prevents passive tracking of astrocyte membrane potential (Vm) to variations in potassium equilibrium (Ek), which is constantly altered by extracellular potassium fluctuations, thereby maintaining a sustained driving force (Vm-Ek) for potassium clearance.

Studies have highlighted channel-independent functions of connexins, involving intracellular signaling, protein interactions, and cell adhesion. Specifically, Cx30 has been shown to regulate the insertion of astroglial processes into synaptic clefts, which controls the efficacy of glutamate clearance. This, in turn, affects the synaptic strength and long-term plasticity of excitatory terminals, indicating a significant role in modulating synaptic transmission. Levels of Cx30 regulate synaptic glutamate concentration, hippocampal excitatory synaptic strength, plasticity, and memory. Astroglial networks have a physiologically optimized size to appropriately regulate neuronal functions.

Cx30 is not limited to regulating excitatory synaptic transmission but also plays a crucial role in inhibitory synaptic regulation and broader neuronal network activities. This highlights the importance of connexins in maintaining the intricate balance required for proper brain function.

==== Retina ====
Neurons within the retina show extensive coupling, both within populations of one cell type and between different cell types.

==== Uterus ====
The uterine muscle (myometrium) remains in a quiescent relaxed state during pregnancy to maintain fetal development. Immediately preceding labor, the myometrium transforms into an activated contractile unit by increasing expression of connexin-43 (CX43, a.k.a. Gap Junction Alpha-1 protein, GJA1) facilitating gap junction (GJ) formation between individual myometrial cells. Importantly, the formation of GJs promotes communication between neighbouring myocytes, which facilitates the transfer of small molecules such as secondary messengers, metabolites, and small ions for electrical coupling. Consistent with all species, uterine myometrial contractions propagate from spontaneous action potentials as a result of sudden change in plasma membrane permeability. This leads to an increase of intracellular Ca²⁺ concentration, facilitating action potential propagation through electrically coupled cells. It has more recently been discovered that uterine macrophages directly physically couples with uterine myocytes through CX43, transferring Ca²⁺, to promote uterine muscle contraction and excitation during labor onset.

=== Hemichannel function ===
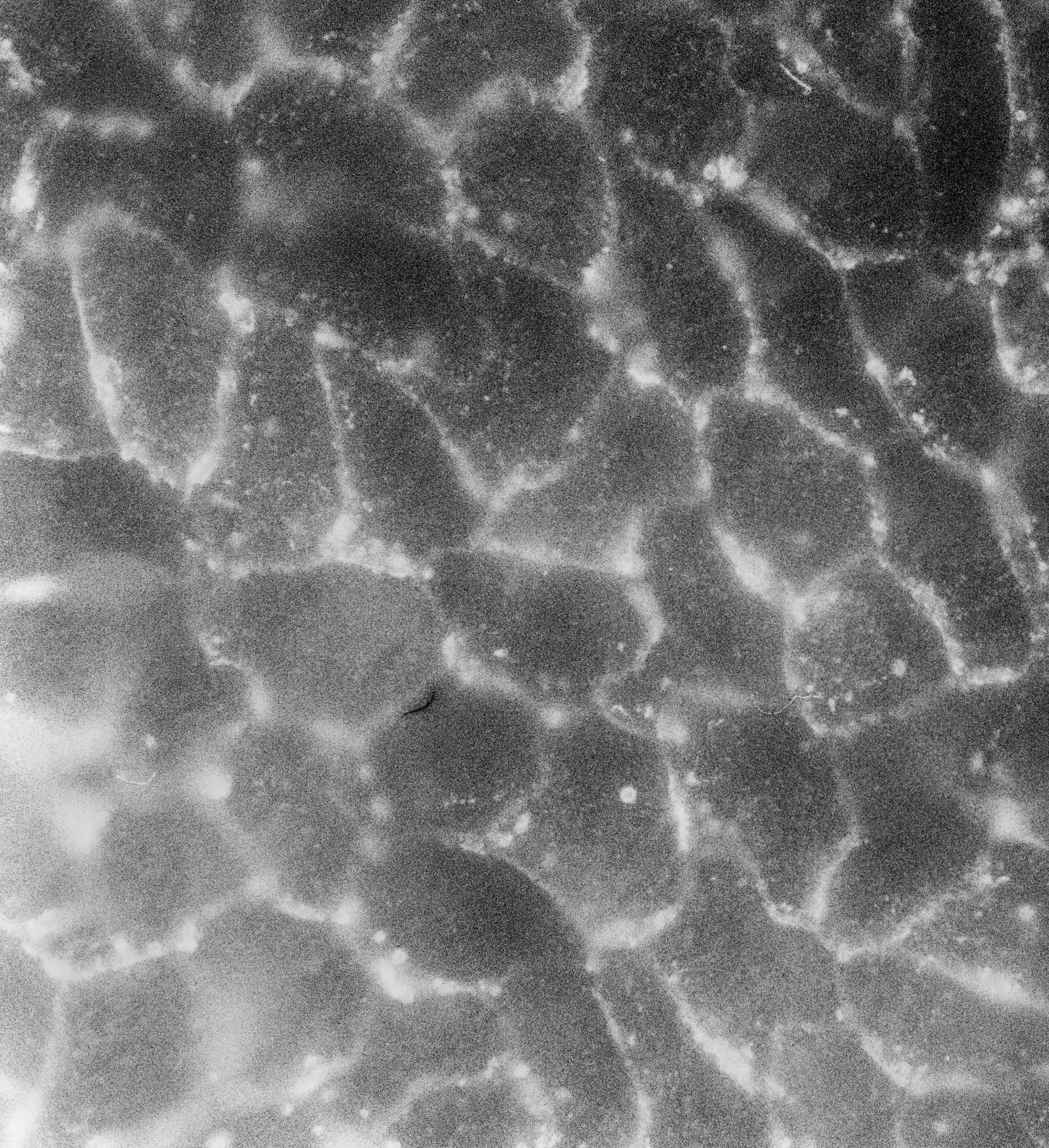
Lens epithelial cells with gap junctions and hemichannels at the interface with fiber cells.

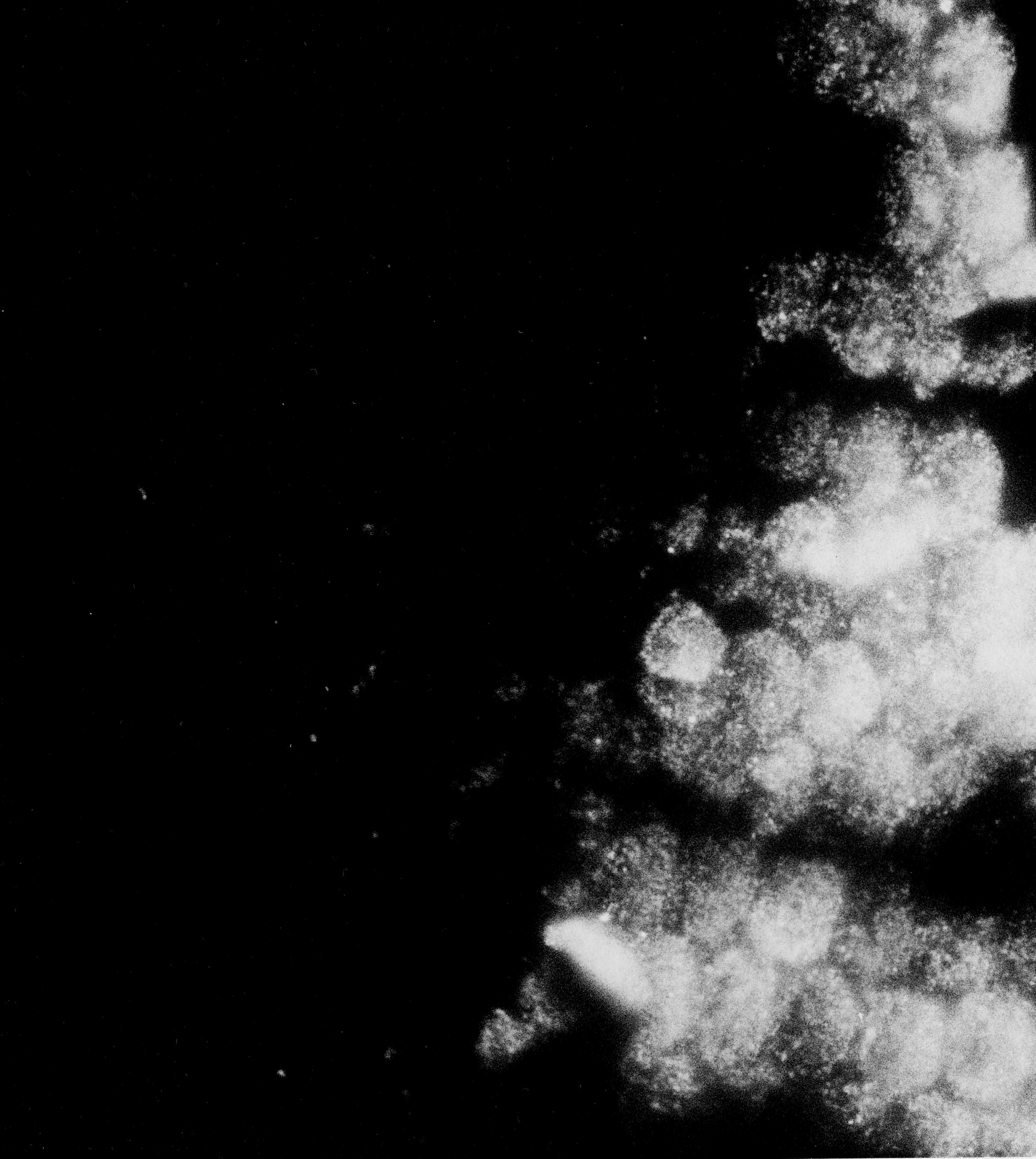
Lens fiber cells ends with gap junctions and hemichannels at the interface with fiber cells.

Hemichannels contribute to a cellular network of gap junctions and allow the release of adenosine triphosphate, glutamate, Nicotinamide adenine dinucleotide, and prostaglandin E2 from cells, which can all act as messengers to cells otherwise disconnected from such messaging. In this sense, a gap junction plaque forms a one-to-one relationship with the neighboring cell, daisy chaining many cells together. Hemichannels form a one to many relationship with the surrounding tissue.

On a larger scale, the one-to-many communication of cells is typically carried out by the vascular and nervous systems. This makes detecting the contribution of hemichannels to extracellular communication more difficult in whole organisms. With the eye lens, the vascular and nervous systems are absent, making reliance on hemichannels greater and their detection easier. At the interface of the lens with the aqueous humor (where the lens exchanges metabolites), both gap junction plaques and more diffused connexon distribution can be seen in the accompanying micrographs.

== Discovery ==
=== Form to function ===
Well before the demonstration of the gap in gap junctions, they were seen at the junction of neighboring nerve cells. The close proximity of the neighboring cell membranes at the gap junction led researchers to speculate that they had a role in intercellular communication, in particular the transmission of electrical signals. Gap junctions were also found to be electrically rectifying in the early studies and referred to as an electrical synapse but are now known to be bidirectional in general. Later, it was found that chemicals could also be transported between cells through gap junctions.

Implicit or explicit in most of the early studies is that the area of the gap junction was different in structure to the surrounding membranes in a way that made it look different. The gap junction had been shown to create a micro-environment between the two cells in the extracellular space or gap. This portion of extracellular space was somewhat isolated from the surrounding space and also bridged by what we now call connexon pairs, which form even more tightly sealed bridges that cross the gap junction gap between two cells. When viewed in the plane of the membrane by freeze-fracture techniques, higher-resolution distribution of connexons within the gap junction plaque is possible.

Connexin free islands are observed in some junctions. The observation was largely without explanation until vesicles were shown by Peracchia using transmission electron microscopy (TEM) thin sections to be systematically associated with gap junction plaques. Peracchia's study was probably also the first study to describe paired connexon structures, which he called a globule. Studies showing vesicles associated with gap junctions and proposing the vesicle contents may move across the junction plaques between two cells were rare, as most studies focused on connexons rather than vesicles. A later study using a combination of microscopy techniques confirmed the early evidence of a probable function for gap junctions in intercellular vesicle transfer. Areas of vesicle transfer were associated with connexin free islands within gap junction plaques. Connexin 43 has been shown to be necessary for the transfer of whole mitochondrias to neighboring cells, though whether the mitochondria is transferred directly through the membrane or within a vesicle has not been determined

=== Electrical and chemical synapses ===
Because of the widespread occurrence of gap junctions in cell types other than nerve cells, the term gap junction became more generally used than terms such as electrical synapse or nexus. Another dimension in the relationship between nerve cells and gap junctions was revealed by studying chemical synapse formation and gap junction presence. By tracing nerve development in leeches with gap junction expression suppressed it was shown that the bidirectional gap junction (electrical nerve synapse) needs to form between two cells before they can grow to form a unidirectional chemical nerve synapse. The chemical nerve synapse is the synapse most often truncated to the more ambiguous term nerve synapse.

=== Composition ===
==== Connexins ====
The purification of the intercellular gap junction plaques enriched in the channel forming protein (connexin) showed a protein forming hexagonal arrays in x-ray diffraction. Because of this, the systematic study and identification of the predominant gap junction protein became possible. Refined ultrastructural studies by TEM showed protein occurred in a complementary fashion in both cells participating in a gap junction plaque. The gap junction plaque is a relatively large area of membrane observed in TEM thin section and freeze fracture (FF) seen filled with transmembrane proteins in both tissues and more gently treated gap junction preparations. With the apparent ability for one protein alone to enable intercellular communication seen in gap junctions the term gap junction tended to become synonymous with a group of assembled connexins though this was not shown in vivo. Biochemical analysis of gap junction isolated from various tissues demonstrated a family of connexins.

The ultrastructure and biochemistry of isolated gap junctions already referenced had indicated the connexins preferentially group in gap junction plaques or domains and connexins were the best characterized constituent. It has been noted that the organisation of proteins into arrays with a gap junction plaque may be significant. It is likely this early work was already reflecting the presence of more than just connexins in gap junctions. Combining the emerging fields of freeze-fracture to see inside membranes and immunocytochemistry to label cell components (Freeze-fracture replica immunolabelling or FRIL and thin section immunolabelling) showed gap junction plaques in vivo contained the connexin protein. Later studies using immunofluorescence microscopy of larger areas of tissue clarified diversity in earlier results. Gap junction plaques were confirmed to have variable composition being home to connexon and non-connexin proteins as well making the modern usage of the terms "gap junction" and "gap junction plaque" non-interchangeable. To summarize, in early literature the term "gap junction" referred to the regular gap between membranes in vertebrates and non-vertebrates apparently bridged by "globules". The junction correlated with the cell's ability to directly couple with its neighbors through pores in their membranes. Then for a while gap junctions were only referring to a structure that contains connexins and nothing more was thought to be involved. Later, the gap junction "plaque" was also found to contain other molecules that helped define it and make it function.

==== The "plaque" or "formation plaque" ====
Immunofluorescence microscopy video of connexins being moved along microtubules to the surface of a cell at 2.7 times normal speed.

Early descriptions of gap junctions, connexons or innexons did not refer to them as such; many other terms were used. It is likely that synaptic disks were an accurate reference to gap junction plaques. While the detailed structure and function of the connexon was described in a limited way at the time the gross disk structure was relatively large and easily seen by various TEM techniques. Disks allowed researchers using TEM to easily locate the connexons contained within the disk like patches in vivo and in vitro. The disk or plaque appeared to have structural properties different from those imparted by the connexons/innexons alone. It was thought that if the area of membrane in the plaque transmitted signals, the area of membrane would have to be sealed in some way to prevent leakage. Later studies showed gap junction plaques are home to non-connexin proteins, making the modern usage of the terms "gap junction" and "gap junction plaque" non-interchangeable as the area of the gap junction plaque may contain proteins other than connexins. Just as connexins do not always occupy the entire area of the plaque, the other components described in the literature may be only long-term or short-term residents.

Studies allowing views inside the plane of the membrane of gap junctions during formation indicated that a "formation plaque" formed between two cells prior to the connexins moving in. They were particle free areas—when observed by TEM FF, indicated very small or no transmembrane proteins were likely present. Little is known about what structures make up the formation plaque or how the formation plaque's structure changes when connexins and other components move in and out. One of the earlier studies of the formation of small gap junctions describes rows of particles and particle free halos. With larger gap junctions they were described as formation plaques with connexins moving into them. The particulate gap junctions were thought to form 4–6 hours after the formation plaques appeared. How the connexins may be transported to the plaques using tubulin is becoming clearer.

The formation of plaque and the non-connexin part of the classical gap junction plaque have been difficult for early researchers to analyse. It appears in TEM FF and thin section to be a lipid membrane domain that can somehow form a comparatively rigid barrier to other lipids and proteins. There has been indirect evidence for certain lipids being preferentially involved with the formation plaque, however this cannot be considered definitive. It is difficult to envisage breaking up the membrane to analyse membrane plaques without affecting their composition. By study of connexins still in membranes lipids associated with the connexins have been studied. It was found that specific connexins tended to associate preferentially with specific phospholipids. As formation plaques precede connexins these results still give no certainty as to what is unique about the composition of plaques themselves. Other findings show connexins associate with protein scaffolds used in another junction, the zonula occludens ZO-1. While this helps us understand how connexins may be moved into a gap junction formation plaque, the composition of the plaque itself is still somewhat sketchy. Some headway on the in vivo composition of the gap junction plaque is being made using TEM FRIL.

== See also ==
- Gap junction modulation
- Gap junction protein
- Innexin
- Vinnexin
- Intercalated disc
- Ion channel
- Junctional complex
- Tight junction
