= Gap junction modulator =

A gap junction modulator is a compound or agent that either facilitates or inhibits the transfer of small molecules between biological cells by regulating gap junctions. Various physiological processes including cardiac, neural or auditory, depend on gap junctions to perform crucial regulatory roles, and the modulators themselves are the key players in this procedure. Gap junctions are necessary for diffusion of small molecules from cell to cell, keeping the cells interlinked and connecting the cytoplasm, allowing transfer of signals or resources between the body.

Many different molecules act as modulators in gap junctions, from simple ions to complex proteins. Protein kinases modulate the opening and closing of connexin pores by moderating phosphorylation. Chemical gating modulators such as calmodulin, calcium, and pH values are key in regulating the gap junction proteins. The functions of different modulators can be categorized into five aspects, including enhancement and inhibition of gap junctions activities; modulation of connexin; voltage specificity; and natural compounds.

These modulators can be potential therapeutic targets for a number of disorders and are essential in the regulation of several physiological processes, potentially providing solutions to some diseases caused by issues in the gap junction.s A variety of gap junction modulators as pharmaceutical agents are being investigated to treat and regulate these diseases, such as amiodarone to treat heart issues such as ventricular arrhythmia, tonabersat to treat Cortical Spreading Depression, or rotigaptide and danegaptide to combat bupropion overdose.

== Gap Junctions ==
Gap junctions are collections of intercellular channels that allow ions and other tiny molecules to move directly between cells. These junctions are made up of a number of gap junction channels that consist of two connexons, each with six protein subunits called connexin, and a gene family of nearly 20 members encodes the connexins found in mammals

Through gap junctions, the majority of cells in tissues communicate with one another, with the exception of a small number of terminally differentiated cells like blood and skeletal muscle cells. The gap junction channels bridge the cytoplasm of the two cells, allowing ions and small molecules to pass in both directions through these channels

== Categories of Gap Junction Modulators ==
=== Protein kinases ===
Protein kinase enzymes moderate phosphorylation, the addition of phosphate groups, to the junction proteins play important roles in controlling the junction protein and their possible subunits.

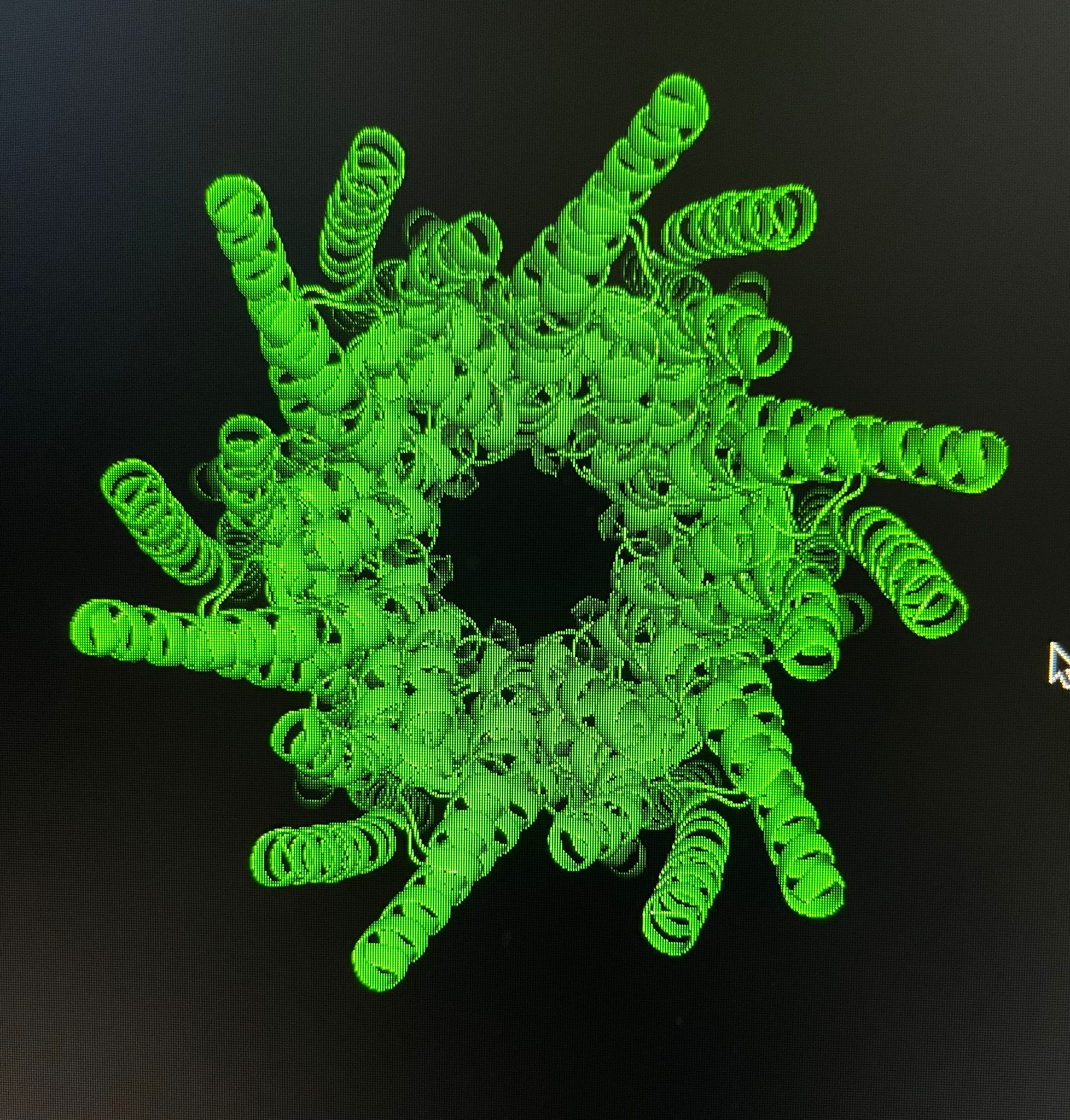
Connexin protein, modelled using pyMOL. pyMOL protein code taken from Protein Data Bank

These kinases, such as PKA and PKC, phosphorylate the connexin gap junctions in the heart. Phosphate group addition changes the charge and configuration of the connexin protein, opening (for PKA) and closing (for PKC) the transmembrane channel pores. These same proteins can also undergo dephosphorylation by phosphatase enzymes, which reverses phosphorylation, reopening or reclosing the connexin pores.

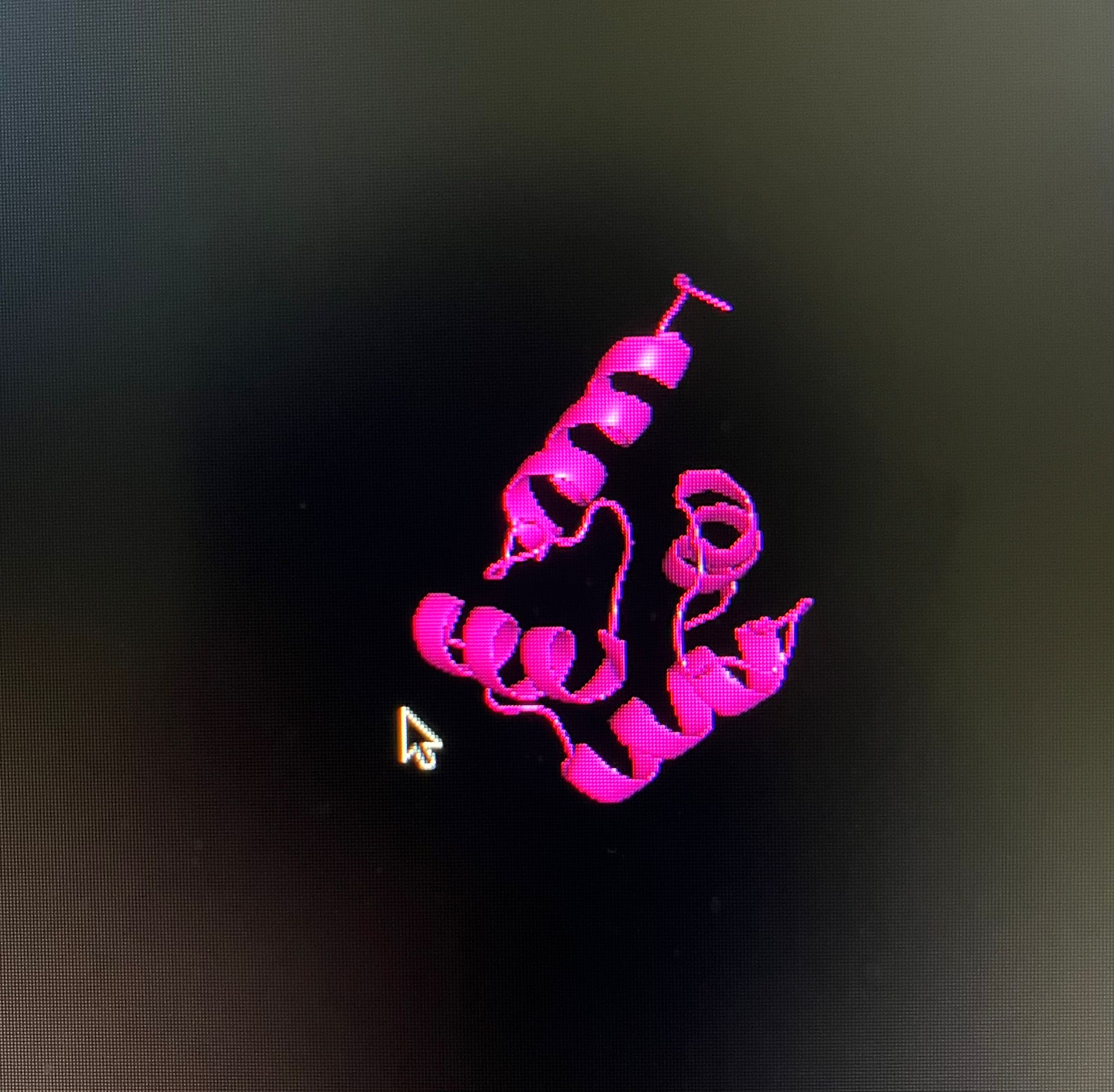
Calmodulin protein, modelled using pyMOL. pyMOL protein code taken from Protein Data Bank

=== Chemical gating ===
==== Calmodulin ====
Calmodulin is a model Ca^{2+} sensor that is very adaptable, and its high-affinity Ca^{2+} binding domains are EF-hands, which is a structure optimized for binding to calcium ions. Calmodulin is present in all eukaryotic cells, which mediates calcium-dependent signalling. Calmodulin conformationally varies upon binding Ca^{2+} to form complexes with a wide range of target proteins.

Intracellular Ca^{2+}activated calmodulin (CaM) inhibits gap junction channels, which is critical for several cellular functions, such as lens transparency, heart contraction synchronization, and hearing.

==== Calcium ====
Calcium ions are a major modulator that can completely close the gap junction proteins. Ca^{2+} ions binding to the amino acid side chains changes the structure of the protein, decreasing connectivity of other molecules. Calcium affects not only connexin, but also Calmodulin, a transmembrane protein present in all eukaryotic cells. Calcium ions are fairly abundant in cells, as they are the main signal ion of the nervous system, where the calcium released by the nervous signals can inform the junction of proteins of changes needed to adapt to their surroundings. Ca^{2+} itself is associated with cell-to-cell uncoupling, which breaks apart the pathway between cells when the pathway itself becomes harmful, such as pathways to injured cells, as the abnormal pathways and communication between injured cells can cause various disorders.

=== pH changes ===
Changes in the pH of the environment to a more acidic or alkaline one can also affect the gap junction protein structure, changing their shape, which closes the diffusion pathways. These pH changes are caused by chemical reactions from other metabolic processes or even inflammation signals from disease or the body's immune system. Significant pH changes are acidification, the addition of hydrogen ions, and alkalinization, the removal of hydrogen ions. Higher pH is associated with the closing of the gap junction channels, either by protonation of amino acids which can change the entire protein structure, or in some cases even denaturing the whole protein if pH is too low, completely preventing passage of molecules through the gap junctions.

== Functionality ==
=== Gap junction enhancers (GJEs) ===
Gap junction enhancers (GJEs) facilitate cell-to-cell communication by increasing gap junction coupling or inducing depolarization across cell membranes. Examples include growth factors like TGF-beta and EGF, which are important in wound healing and tissue repair; retinoic acid, which plays a part in cellular differentiation; and acetylcholine (ACh), which contributes to learning, motivation, alertness, focus, and the stimulation of rapid eye movement (REM) sleep in the brain depolarizes the membrane potential closer to the threshold, thereby increasing the chance of neuron firing (the transfer of neurotransmitters).

=== Gap junction inhibitors (GJIs) ===
Gap junction inhibitors (GJIs) lessen communication between cells by lowering gap junction coupling or inducing hyperpolarization across cell membranes. Among them are the anti-inflammatory and anti-tumor effects of 18-alpha-glycyrrhetinic acid (18-AGA); carbenoxolone, which are used to treat inflammatory diseases; and Gamma-aminobutyric acid (GABA), which blocks signals and lessens the likelihood to generate action potential through the hyperpolarization of neurons. These inhibitors play a significant part in regulating the hyperactivity of nerve cells linked to stress, anxiety, and terror.

=== Connexin (Cx) specific modulators ===
Connexin (Cx) specific modulators target the building blocks of gap junction channels - connexin proteins. For example, the Cx43 mimetic peptides Gap26 and Gap27 bind to extracellular loop regions one and two of CxHc (connexin hemichannels), respectively, to selectively block Cx43-based gap junctions, resulting in the rapid closure of these channels.

=== Voltage-dependent modulators ===
Voltage-dependent modulators modify the cell membrane potential, which has an impact on gap junctions. For instance, substances like heptanol and quinine act as modulators and can interfere with gap junctions' ability to sense voltage, which inhibits the junctions.

=== Natural compounds ===
A variety of natural compounds such as flavonoids have been reported to modulate gap junction activity. For example, it has been shown that the dietary flavonoid quercetin inhibits gap junction communication in specific cell types such as cardiovascular cells or cancer cells.

== Pharmaceutical agents ==
It has been found that many drugs either work primarily by modulating gap junction function or produce unintended side effects. Drugs that inhibit gap junction communication include the antiarrhythmic drug amiodarone, the anti-migraine drug tonabersat; or drugs that promote gap junction conduction, such as rotigaptide and danegaptide.

=== Amiodarone ===
Structural formula of amiodarone.

Amiodarone treats ventricular arrhythmia, a potentially fatal form of arrhythmia, a disease of the heart where it has an irregular heartbeat that is either too fast or too slow. It is especially recommended for patients who do not respond well to other typical therapies. Amiodarone belongs to the third antiarrhythmic pharmacological class, which is known as antiarrhythmic drugs. It helps to maintain a regular heart rhythm by acting directly on heart tissue and effectively slowing down nerve impulses to the heart. In addition, amiodarone inhibits the potassium current, which repolarizes the myocardium during the third phase of the cardiac action potential. As a result, the effective folding time of the heart cells and the length of the action potential are prolonged, which in turn reduces the incidence of arrhythmia.

=== Tonabersat ===
Structural formula of tonabersat.

Tonabersat is a novel benzopyran compound that selectively binds to a unique brain site, α2δ-1 subunit of voltage-gated calcium channels. This reduces calcium intake of this channel. Calcium intake reduction of the channels is associated with reducing Cortical Spreading Depression (CSD) as it inhibits gap-junction communication. This is important as CSD relies on neuronal-glial cell communication through connexin-containing gap junctions and hemichannels, and this abnormal sensory processing due to peripheral and/or central sensitization is found to cause migraines.

=== Rotigaptide and danegaptide ===
Recently, rotigaptide and danegaptide were found to be effective as an antidote to toxicity caused by overdose of certain drugs, such as Bupropion. Bupropion is an antidepressant, but is also a cardiotoxin if ingested in large doses. Rotigaptide and danegaptide, two small-molecule medications that increase gap junction conductance by facilitating gap junction activity, can prevent the binding or passing of bupropion to the cardiac gap junctions. Thus the modulators can be essential to preventing overdose of bupropion.

== See also ==
- Gap junction modulation
- Gap junction protein
