= Peptide vaccine =

Peptide-based subunit vaccine which immunizes an organism against a pathogen

Peptide-based synthetic vaccines (epitope vaccines) are subunit vaccines made from peptides. The peptides mimic the epitopes of the antigen that triggers direct or potent immune responses. Peptide vaccines can not only induce protection against infectious pathogens and non-infectious diseases but also be utilized as therapeutic cancer vaccines, where peptides from tumor-associated antigens are used to induce an effective anti-tumor T-cell response.

== History ==
The traditional vaccines are the whole live or fixed pathogens. The second generation of vaccines is mainly the protein purified from the pathogen. The third generation of vaccines is the DNA or plasmid that can express the proteins of the pathogen. Peptide vaccines are the latest step in the evolution of vaccines.

== Advantages and disadvantages ==
Compared with the traditional vaccines such as the whole fixed pathogens or protein molecules, the peptide vaccines have several advantages and disadvantages.

Advantages:

- The vaccines are fully synthesized by chemical synthesis and can be treated as chemical entity.
- With more advanced solid-phase peptide synthesis (SPPS) using automation and microwave techniques, the production of peptides becomes more efficient.
- The vaccines do not have any biological contamination since they are chemically synthesized.
- The vaccines are water-soluble and can be kept stable under simple conditions.
- The peptides can be specially designed for specificity. A single peptide vaccine can be designed to have multiple epitopes to generate immune responses for several diseases.
- The vaccines only contain a short peptide chain, so they are less like to lead to allergic or auto-immune responses.

Disadvantages:

- Poor immunogenicity.
- Unstable in cells.
- Lack of native conformation.
- Only effective for a limited population.

== Epitope design ==
The whole peptide vaccine is to mimic the epitope of an antigen, so epitope design is the most important stage of vaccine development and requires an accurate understanding of the amino acid sequence of the immunogenic protein interested. The designed epitope is expected to generate strong and long-period immuno-response against the pathogen. The followings are the points to consider when designing the epitope:

- The non-dominant epitope could generate a stronger immune response than the dominant epitope. Ex. The antibodies from people infected by hookworm can recognize the dominant epitope of the antigen called Necator americanus APR-1 protein, but the antibodies can't induce protection against hookworm. However, other non-dominant epitopes on APR-1 protein show the ability to induce the production of neutralizing antibodies against hookworm. Therefore, the non-dominant epitopes are the better candidate for peptide vaccines against hookworm infection.
- Take hypersensitivity into consideration. Ex. Some IgE-inducing epitopes cause hypersensitivity reactions after vaccination in humans due to the overlap with IgG epitopes in the Na-ASP-2 protein which is an antigen from hookworm.
- Some short peptide epitopes need elongating to maintain the native conformation. The elongated sequences can include proper secondary structure. Also, some short peptides can be stabled or cyclized together to maintain the proper conformation. Ex. B-cell epitopes could only have 5 amino acids. To induce an immune response, a sequence from yeast GCN4 protein is used to improve the conformation of the peptide vaccines by forming alpha-helix.
- Use adjuvants associated with the epitope to induce the immune response.

== Applications ==
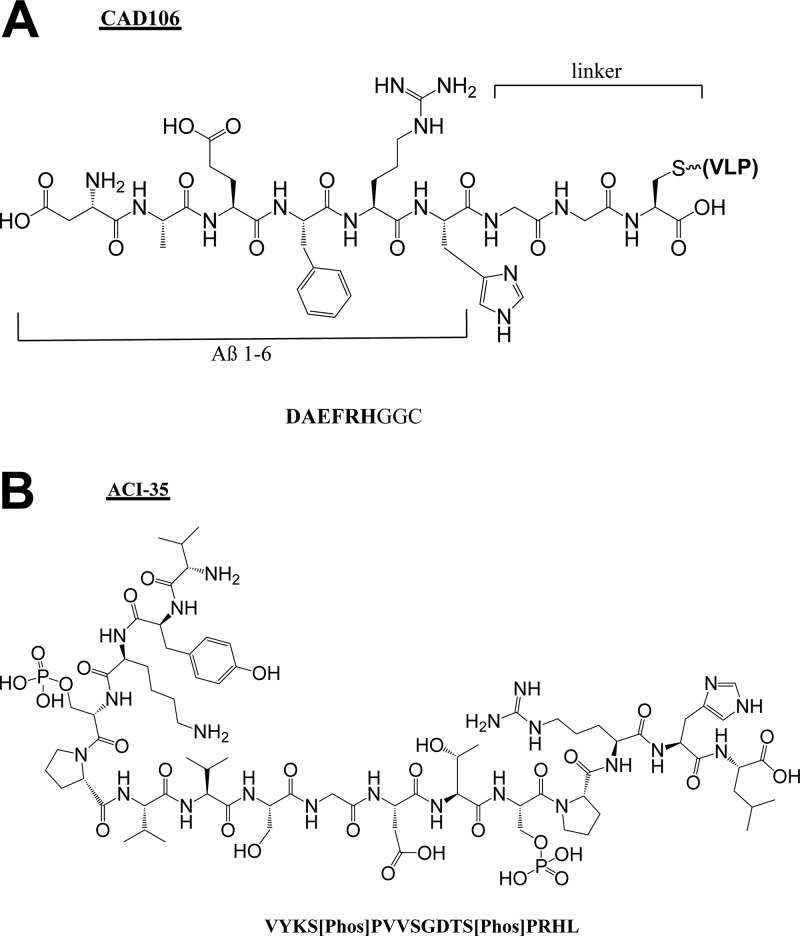
Chemical structures of peptide components of Alzheimer peptide vaccines (A) CAD106 and (B) ACI-35.

=== Cancer ===
- Gp100 peptide vaccine is studied to treat melanoma. To generate a greater in vitro CTL response, the peptide, gp100:209-217(210M), is modified and binds to HLA-A2*0201. After vaccination, more circulating T cells can recognize and kill melanoma cancer cells in vitro.
- Rindopepimut is the epidermal growth factor receptor (EGFR)-derived peptide vaccine to treat glioblastoma multiforme (GBM). The 14-mer peptide is coupled with keyhole limpet hemocyanin (KLH), which can reduce the risk of cancer.
- E75, GP2, and AE37 are three different HER2/neu-derived single-peptide vaccines to treat breast cancer. HER2/neu usually has low expression in healthy tissues. E75 consisting of 9 amino acids is the immunodominant epitope of the HER2 protein. GP2 consisting of 9 amino acids is the subdominant epitope. Both E75 and GP2 stimulate the CD8+ lymphocytes but GP2 has a lower affinity than E75. AE37 stimulates CD4+ lymphocytes.

=== Other common diseases ===
- EpiVacCorona, a peptide-based vaccine against COVID-19.
- IC41 is a peptide vaccine candidate against the Hepatitis C virus. It consists of five synthetic peptides along with the synthetic adjuvant called poly-l-arginine.
- Multimeric-001 is the most efficient peptide vaccine candidate against influenza. It contains B- and T-cell epitopes from Hemagglutinin. Matrix I and nucleoprotein are combined into a single recombinantly-expressed polypeptide.
- Alzheimer peptide vaccines: CAD106, UB311, Lu, AF20513, ABvac40, ACI-35, AADvac-1.
