= GJE =

GJE could refer to:

- Gje, Cyrillic script letter
- Grand Jury Européen, Luxembourg-based association
- Gap junction enhancer, subcategory of gap junction modulators in biology
- Gap junction ε, subcategory of gap junction proteins
