= C20H26N2O4 =

The molecular formula C_{20}H_{26}N_{2}O_{4} (molar mass: 358.43 g/mol) may refer to:

- Binospirone, a partial agonist at 5HT1A somatodendritic autoreceptors
- Itopride, a prokinetic benzamide derivative
- Ronactolol, a beta blocker
