= Gap junction modulation =

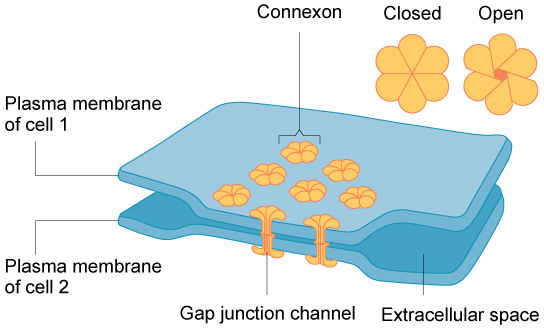
Structure and location of gap junctions on cellular membranes.

Gap junction modulation describes the functional manipulation of gap junctions, specialized channels that allow direct electrical and chemical communication between cells without exporting material from the cytoplasm. Gap junctions play an important regulatory role in various physiological processes including signal propagation in cardiac muscles and tissue homeostasis of the liver. Modulation is required, since gap junctions must respond to their environment, whether through an increased expression or permeability. Impaired or altered modulation can have significant health implications and are associated with the pathogenesis of the liver, heart and intestines.

Modulation is achieved by endogenous chemicals, growth factors, hormones and proteins that affect gap junction expression, structure, degradation and permeability. Natural forms of modulation include voltage gating and chemical modulation. Voltage-gating is a relatively fast modulation categorized into Vj gating and slow voltage gating, which are further influenced by calcium ions (Ca^{2+}), pH and calmodulin. Chemical modulation entails the addition or removal of a functional group or protein from the connexin subunits of gap junctions; this can alter gap junction expression and structure.

== Voltage gating ==
The molecular structure of gap junctions makes them sensitive and responsive to intercellular currents. This sensitivity allows the channel to alter its size and structure according to electrical signals. The two types of voltage gating, Vj gating and slow voltage gating, are similar in their mechanisms, but react to different electrical magnitudes. The electrical signals that modulate gap junctions release Ca^{2+} which induces a positive feedback with voltage gating. This calcium modulation is also influenced by pH and calmodulin.

=== Mechanisms ===
==== Vj gating ====
Vj gating governs the size of the gap junction, and is able to reduce the channel size by up to 40% from its fully open state. The sensitivity towards voltage is largely attributed to the gap junction’s cytoplasmic NH2-terminal which is responsive to small voltages (2-3mV). Voltage gating modulation is associated with the charge of connexin; positively charged connexin close with hyperpolarization and negatively charged connexins close with depolarization. Other than connexin charge, Vj gating is also regulated by different concentrations of Ca^{2+}, H^{+} and calmodulin.

==== Slow voltage gating ====
Slow voltage gating is hypothesized to be similar to Vj gating in terms of mechanism, but unlike Vj gating, fully closes the channel to a non-conducting state. This modulation is slower than the prior gating method, as it occurs in response to Vj gating. The temporal voltage regulation is also subject to higher voltage (10-30mV), various natural factors–such as lipophiles and low pH–and the docking of two hemichannels. The exact mechanisms of both Vj gating and slow voltage gating remain unknown, but it is predicted that change in charge causes the cytoplasmic NH2-terminal domain to move toward the cytoplasm to decrease the pore size.

=== Factors ===
==== Calcium ====
Calcium exists in organisms in the form of the ion, Ca^{2+}, and is an effective modulator of gap junctions, having a close relationship with voltage gating. An increase in intracellular calcium ion concentration by above 500nM causes the permeability of plasma membranes to decreases rapidly. This modulation via calcium is known to be protective, as it prevents dead cells from inducing apoptosis in neighboring cells. Yet, high Ca^{2+} concentration is rarely seen, as this gating method is self-inhibiting. Ca^{2+} concentrations are a crucial determiner behind voltage gating as the influx and movement of Ca^{2+} is required for depolarization.

==== pH ====
Gap junction permeability is further influenced by their environment’s pH. The pH sensitivity depends on the type of connexin composing the gap junction, but the channels generally close at a pH of 6.4-6.2. Under weak acidic conditions, the gap junction’s channels are observed to remain closed despite voltage changes, while under strong acidic conditions, the channels do open with voltage, but close immediately.

Reports further indicate a synergistic relationship between hydrogen ions and the intracellular concentration of calcium in reducing gap junction permeability. Studies on cardiac cells noted that acidosis, decreased pH, by itself had a limited effect in reducing dye diffusion between cells; the reduction was elevated significantly with an increase in intracellular calcium concentration.

==== Calmodulin ====
Calmodulin (CaM) is a protein composed of 148 amino acids that plays both an intermediary and direct role in moderating gap junctions. Calmodulin acts as a regulator on membrane channels including both small and intermediate Ca^{2+}-activated potassium ion channels, L-type Ca^{2+} channels, P/Q-type Ca^{2+} channels and sodium ion channels. All of these membrane channels can further influence cation concentrations, determining the electrochemical gradient of the cellular membrane, and affecting voltage gating.

Calmodulin also acts directly on gap junctions through its two Ca^{2+} binding sites. With the binding of Ca^{2+}, calmodulin goes through a conformational change that eventually blocks the gap junction’s channel, preventing the passage of cytoplasmic material. Likewise, while the inhibition of calmodulin expression increases the probability of gap junction closure, CaM-antagonist and CaM-blockers promote the opening of gap junctions.

== Chemical modification ==
Chemical modification takes place on connexin proteins after their translation and typically involves changes in phosphorylation and ubiquitination, although nitrosylation, deamidation and hydroxylation have also been noted to be modifying processes. The implications of chemical modification vary widely depending on the functional group or protein that was added and the connexin proteins involved. Typically the changes occur in the development and lifecycle of the connexin protein or in the gating and structure of gap junctions themselves.

=== Mechanisms ===
==== Phosphorylation ====
Phosphorylation, the addition of a phosphate group, plays an important role in regulating both gap junctions and the subunits that form them. The gap junction protein connexin generally possesses a number of phosphorylation sites (connexin Cx43 has 21). The binding of phosphate to these sites can bring about various effects that influence aspects of the protein’s lifecycle. For example, phosphorylation of Cx43’s phosphorylation sites promote its trafficking from the Golgi apparatus to the plasma membrane. The subsequent oligomerization of this protein into hemichannels and the hemichannels into gap junctions is also induced by phosphorylation. Likewise, degradation can be initiated by phosphorylation as well as changes in gating, which determines the permeability of gap junctions.

Phosphorylation of gap junctions and their subunits is typically achieved through protein kinases, enzymes that add phosphates to the amino acids of proteins. Serine/threonine kinases, which phosphorylate the hydroxyl group of serine or threonine residues, form the bulk of the Connexin phosphorylation kinases. These include protein kinase C (PKC), protein kinase G (PKG), Ca2+/calmodulin-dependent kinase II (CaMKII), cAMP-dependent protein kinase A (PKA), MAP kinase (MAPK) and casein kinase (CK). Kinase Src is the lone Tyrosine kinase that has been observed to phosphorylate connexins. Protein kinases vary in their targeted connections, specific sites of phosphorylation and phosphorylation effect.

For example, PKA phosphorylation impacts both hemichannel and connexin activity. Here, neuronal hemichannel activity is suppressed by reducing permeability while connexins are affected by an increased trafficking and assembly into gap junctions. PKA activity is largely associated with an increased cAMP concentration. On the other hand, PKB phosphorylation can prevent the binding of the zonula occludens-1 protein, resulting in an increased gap junction size and hemichannel permeability. Its activity is usually in response to physiological changes such as wounding or hypoxia.

==== Ubiquitination ====
Ubiquitin is a small, long lived, globular protein that covalently bonds to lysine residues of target proteins in a process known as ubiquitination. Much like phosphorylation, it acts as a post-translational regulator for many proteins including connexin. Ubiquitination has been observed to be most involved in the final stages of the connexin protein’s lifecycle, regulating both Gap junction endocytosis and Connexin degradation. However, details of specific pathways and involved proteins are still being studied.

The distinct effects of ubiquitination tend to vary widely, depending on the tissues and subcellular location where it occurs and the type of ubiquitin involved. For example, newly synthesized Cx43 in the endoplasmic reticulum can undergo polyubiquitination, resulting in recognition by proteasomes that carry out endoplasmic reticulum associated protein degradation (ERAD). Ubiquitination of Cx43 that is at the plasma membrane and organized into gap junctions will result in internalization, or endocytosis, followed by degradation of Cx43 by lysosomes.

==== Nitrosylation ====
Nitrosylation, the addition of a Nitric oxide (NO) group, has been demonstrated to have a substantial role in causing post translational modifications of both gap junction proteins and hemichannels. Nitrosylation can either be induced on the connexin proteins or proteins that further regulate connexin such as kinases. The type of nitrosylation that occurs is S-nitrosylation, the addition of a nitric oxide group to a cysteine thiol of a protein.

Experiments regarding S-nitrosylation and the lifecycle of gap junctions suggest it has a role in regulating hemichannel trafficking and gap junction formation; addition of NO rapidly increased the level of Cx40 and Cx43 connexin at the plasma membrane as well as the formation of gap junctions in endothelial cells. The mechanism behind this phenomenon is still unknown but the pro oxidant conditions induced by NO is thought to modulate the properties of the Golgi apparatus which is responsible for modifying and sorting proteins.

== Related diseases ==
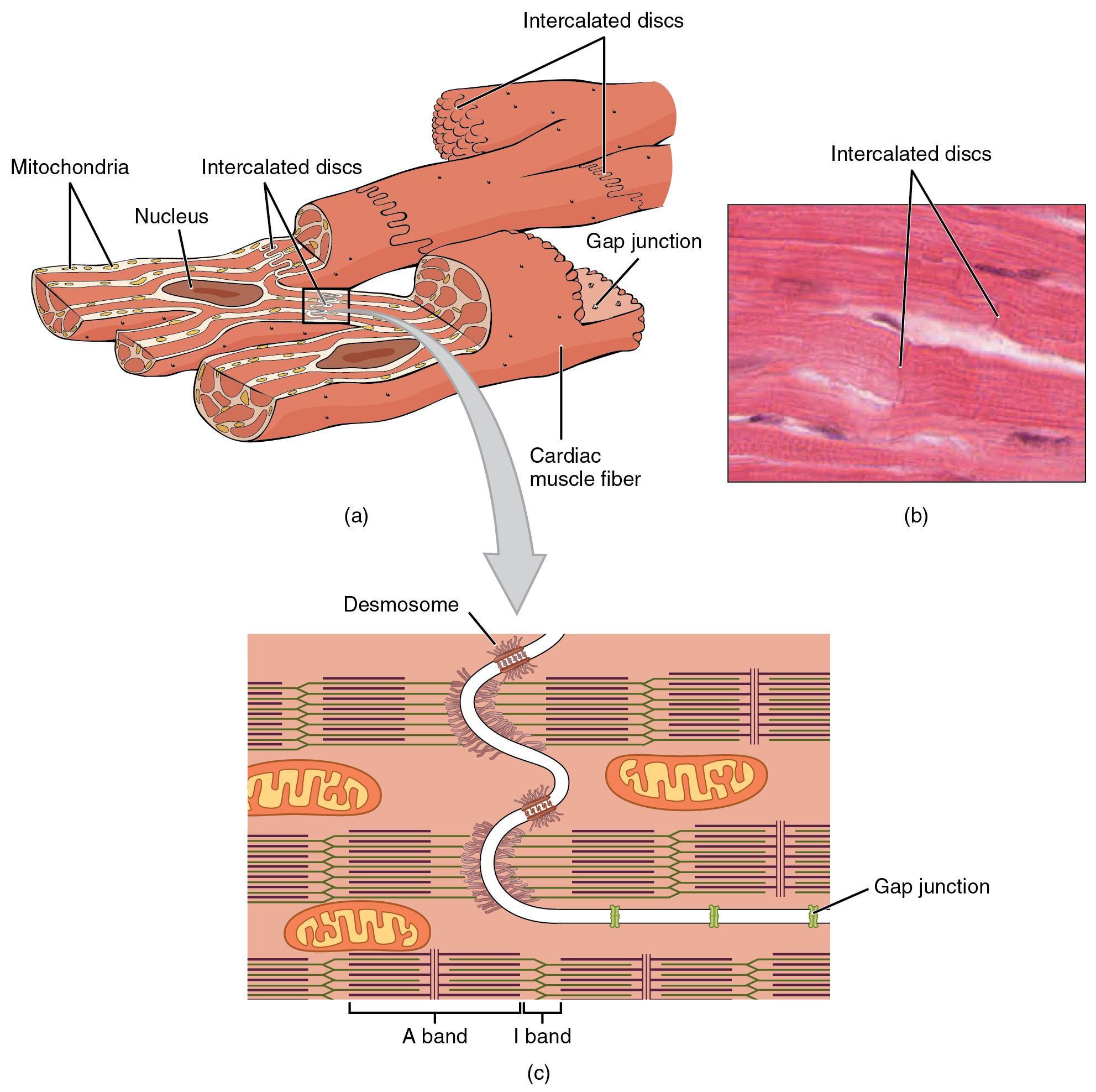
Position of gap junctions in cardiac muscle fiber.

=== Arrhythmogenic cardiomyopathy ===
Electrical coupling among cardiac cells is crucial for a healthy heart, allowing the cardiac muscle fibers to contract normally. This coupling is done by gap junctions. Gap junctions permit the passive diffusion of materials–such as ions–across the cytoplasm of one cell to another; this junction enables proper propagation of electrical impulses along cardiac cells.

The genetic cardiac disease, Arrhythmogenic Cardiomyopathy (ACM), is marked by the reduced expression/number of the heart’s gap junctions, which can further lead to impaired function and ventricular arrhythmia. This disease results from an altered expression of proteins, including Neural Cadherin (CDH2) and Plakophilin-2 (PKP2), which naturally promote gap junction expression. Decreased CDH2 is found to reduce the expression of connexin 43 (Cx43), a major protein that promotes gap junction synthesis, further leading to a reduced conduction velocity of electrical impulses. Decrease in PKP2 also limits Cx43 expression, but only with a concurrent decrease in the reduction of N-Cadherin.

=== Liver diseases ===
As gap junctions have a major role in regulating the homeostasis of the liver, an abnormal expression of gap junctions can be a major contributor towards liver failure. Taking cirrhosis and acute liver failure (ACLF) for examples, an increased expression of hepatic connexin 43 is associated with severe inflammation. Conditions are worsened as the increased expression of Cx43 rapidly propagates death signals to neighboring cells, causing them to undergo apoptosis.

=== Gastrointestinal diseases ===
Just as with the heart, gap junctions play a significant role in mediating electrical signals within the intestines. Electrical signals are necessary for the synchronization of smooth muscles, buffering substrate concentrations, and mediating inflammation. As such, dysfunction of gap junctions leads to numerous symptoms such as gastrointestinal infections and inflammatory bowel disease.

The pathogenesis of gap junctions varies between diseases. For inflammatory bowel disease, a decrease in gap junction expression disrupts junctional complexes among intestinal cells, leading to symptoms such as diarrhea and internal cramps. Less is known about the mechanism behind the pathogenesis of gap junctions in gastrointestinal infections, but the correlation is clear: infections are marked with increased Cx43 levels and their abnormal localization.

== See also ==
- Gap junction
- Junctional complex
- Vinnexin
