= Oculodentodigital dysplasia =

- Other names: Oculo-dento-digital syndrome, Oculodentodigital dysplasia, and Oculodentoosseous dysplasia
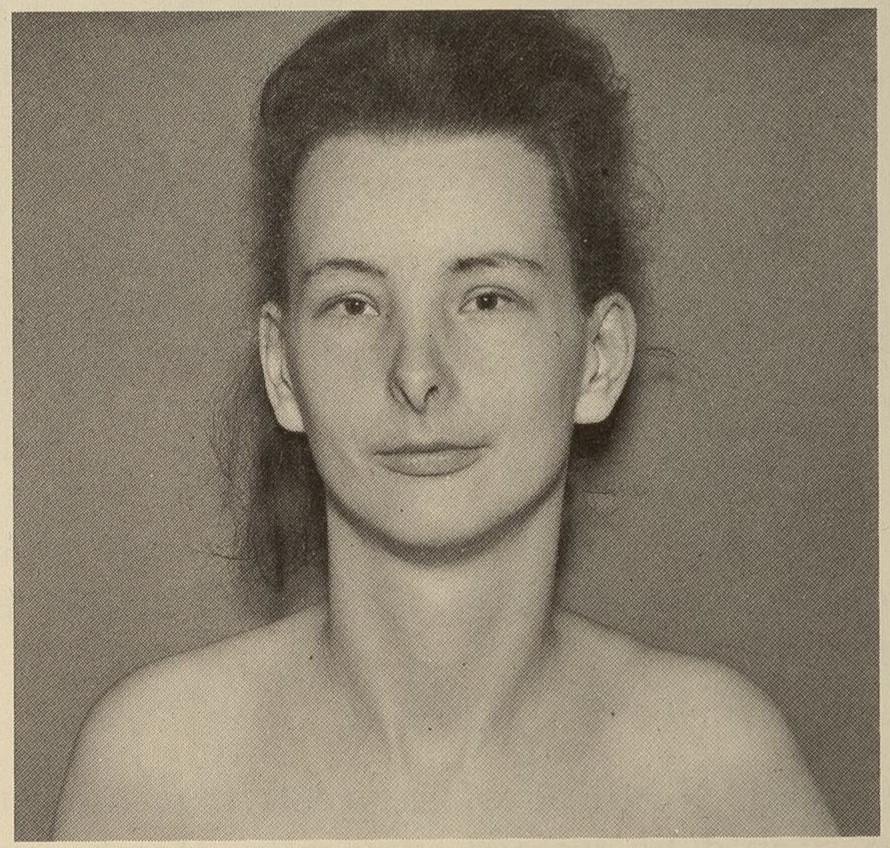
- Woman with oculodentodigital dysplasia

Oculodentodigital syndrome (ODD syndrome) is an extremely rare genetic condition that typically results in small eyes, underdeveloped teeth, and syndactyly and malformation of the fourth and fifth fingers. It is considered a kind of ectodermal dysplasia.

== Signs and symptoms ==
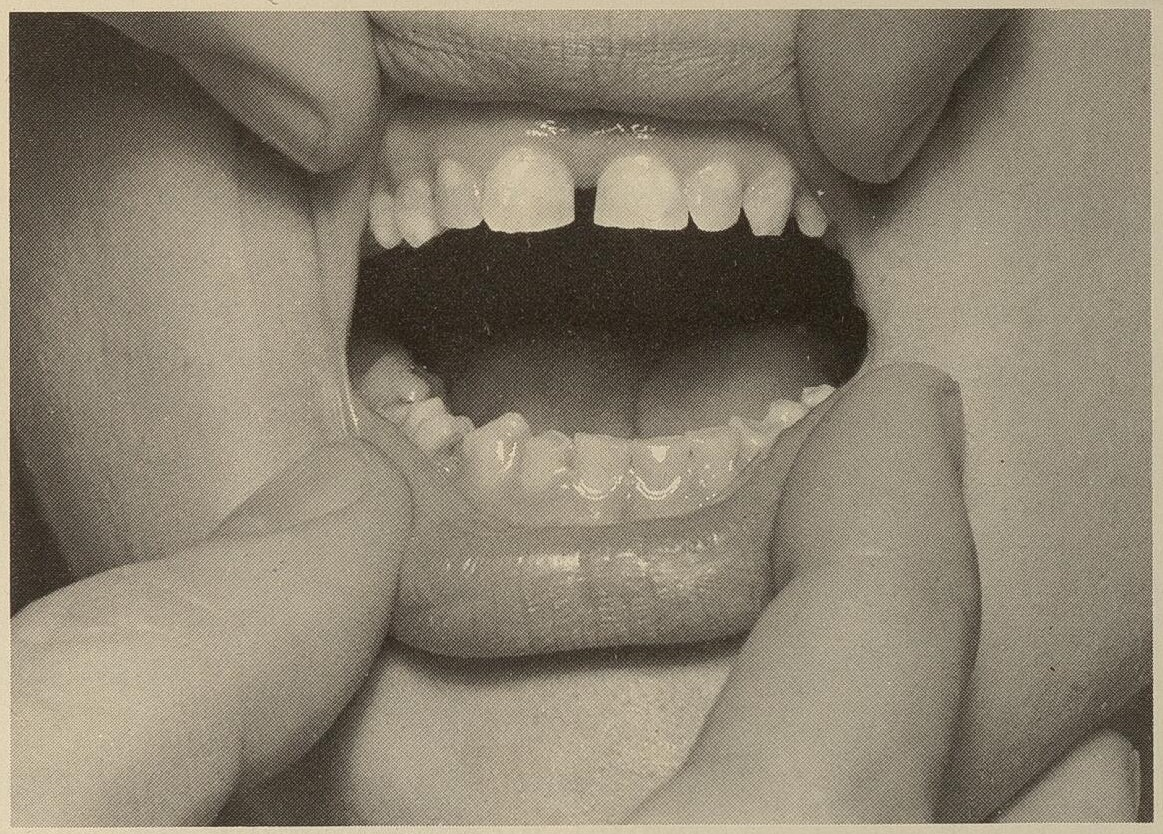

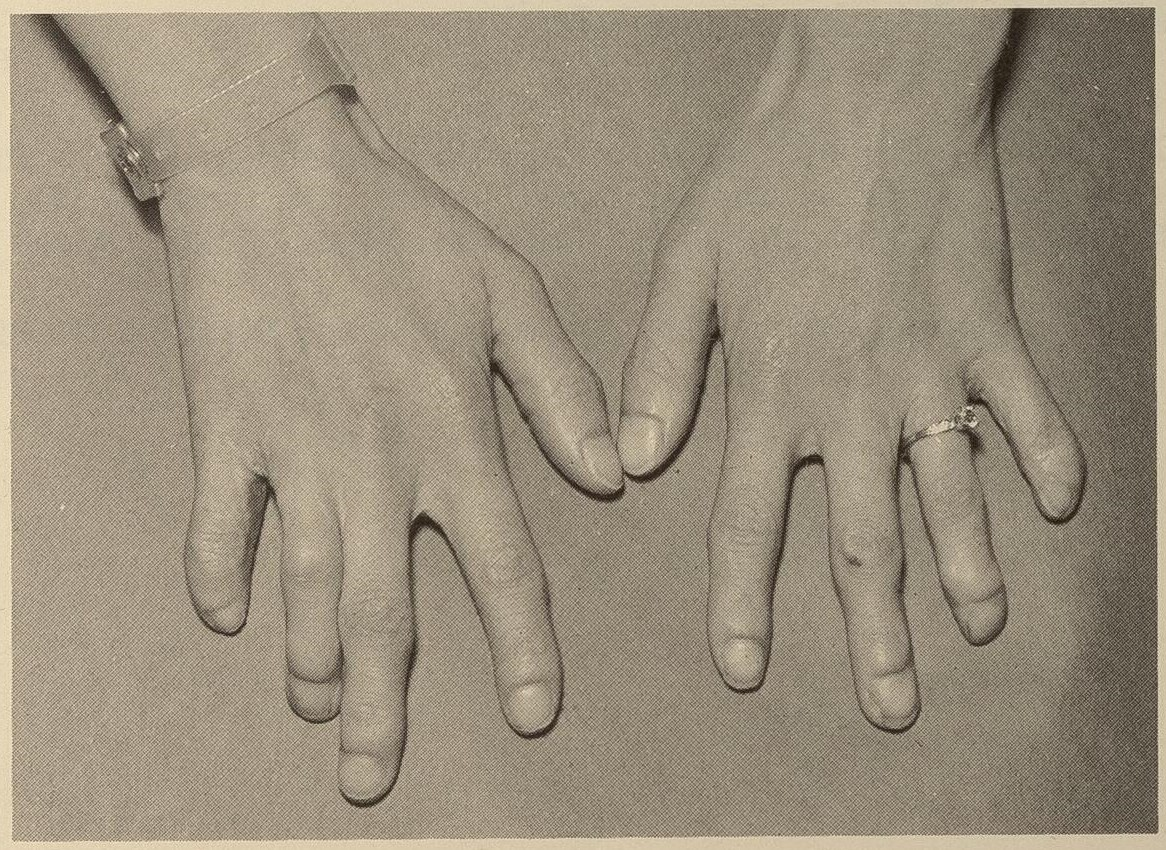
Characteristics of teeth and fingers in oculodentodigital dysplasia

People with ODD syndrome often have a characteristic appearance. Visible features of the condition include:

- small teeth that are prone to dental caries because of underdeveloped tooth enamel;
- a long, thin nose;
- unusually small eyes; and
- type III syndactyly of the fourth and fifth fingers.

Iris atrophy and glaucoma are more common than average. The size of the eyes often interferes with learning to read; special eyeglasses may be required. Hair may be fine, thin, dry, or fragile; in some families, it is curly.

Neurologic abnormalities may be seen in adults. The neurologic changes may appear earlier in each subsequent generation and can include abnormal white matter, conductive deafness, and various kinds of paresis, including ataxia, spastic paraplegia, difficulty controlling the eyes, and bladder and bowel disturbances.

== Genetics ==
ODD is typically an autosomal dominant condition, but can be inherited as a recessive trait. It is generally believed to be caused by a mutation in the gene GJA1, which codes for the gap junction protein connexin 43. Slightly different mutations in this gene may explain the different way the condition manifests in different families. Most people inherit this condition from one of their parents, but new cases do arise through novel mutations. The mutation has high penetrance and variable expression, which means that nearly all people with the gene show signs of the condition, but these signs can range from very mild to very obvious.

== Epidemiology ==
The actual incidence of this disease is not known, but as of 2002, only 243 cases had been reported in the scientific literature, suggesting an incidence of on the order of one affected person in ten million people.
