= Riodipine =

Names
- Preferred IUPAC name Dimethyl 4-[2-(difluoromethoxy)phenyl]-2,6-dimethyl-1,4-dihydropyridine-3,5-dicarboxylate

Identifiers
CAS Number	71653-63-9
3D model (JSmol)	Interactive image
ChemSpider	62136
MeSH	C045912
PubChem CID	68909
UNII	W12VDB26LB
CompTox Dashboard (EPA)	DTXSID5046148
- InChI: InChI=1S/C18H19F2NO5/c1-9-13(16(22)24-3)15(14(10(2)21-9)17(23)25-4)11-7-5-6-8-12(11)26-18(19)20/h5-8,15,18,21H,1-4H3 Key: AZVFIZVKGSPGPK-UHFFFAOYSA-N; InChI=1/C18H19F2NO5/c1-9-13(16(22)24-3)15(14(10(2)21-9)17(23)25-4)11-7-5-6-8-12(11)26-18(19)20/h5-8,15,18,21H,1-4H3 Key: AZVFIZVKGSPGPK-UHFFFAOYAO
- SMILES: CC1=C(C(C(=C(N1)C)C(=O)OC)C2=CC=CC=C2OC(F)F)C(=O)OC

Properties
Chemical formula	C_{18}H_{19}F_{2}NO_{5}
Molar mass	367.349 g·mol^{−1}
- Except where otherwise noted, data are given for materials in their standard state (at 25 °C [77 °F], 100 kPa). verify (what is ?) Infobox references

Riodipine (INN; brand names Foridon and Ryosidine) is a calcium channel blocker.
