= Rontalizumab =

Chemical compound

Monoclonal antibody
- Type: Whole antibody
- Source: Humanized
- Target: IFN-α

Clinical data
- ATC code: none

Identifiers
- CAS Number: 948570-30-7
- ChemSpider: none
- UNII: LDO2FIQ61I
- KEGG: D09662

Chemical and physical data
- Formula: C_{6486}H_{9990}N_{1722}O_{2026}S_{44}
- Molar mass: 145917.93 g·mol^{−1}

Rontalizumab is a humanized monoclonal antibody being developed by Genentech. As of November 2009, it is being investigated in a clinical trial for the treatment of systemic lupus erythematosus.
