= Roledumab =

Monoclonal antibody

Monoclonal antibody
- Type: Whole antibody
- Source: Human
- Target: RHD

Clinical data
- ATC code: none

Identifiers
- CAS Number: 1174008-79-7
- ChemSpider: none
- UNII: Z4T52O86QV

Roledumab is a monoclonal antibody. It binds to RHD, the Rhesus factor antigen.

It is currently at Phase III trials for Rh disease.
