= Rimoprogin =

Antifungal compound

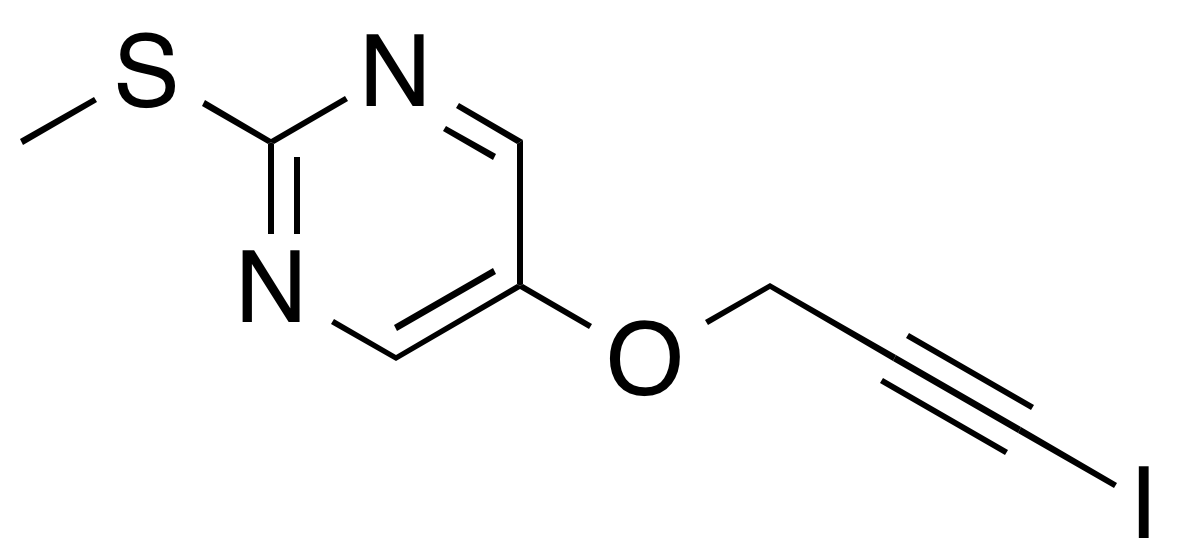

Clinical data
- Other names: Rimoprogina, Rimoprogine, Rimoproginum, Ioproginum, Jopagrin, Jaritin, Methiodine

Identifiers
- IUPAC name: 5-[(3-Iodoprop-2-yn-1-yl)oxy]-2-(methylsulfanyl)pyrimidine
- CAS Number: 37750-83-7
- PubChem CID: 65804
- DrugBank: DB21105
- ChemSpider: 59220
- UNII: QG8198SR7M
- KEGG: D09851
- ChEMBL: ChEMBL2106890
- CompTox Dashboard (EPA): DTXSID90191198
- ECHA InfoCard: 100.048.757

Chemical and physical data
- Formula: C_{8}H_{7}IN_{2}OS
- Molar mass: 306.12 g·mol^{−1}
- 3D model (JSmol): Interactive image
- SMILES: c1(ncc(cn1)OCC#CI)SC
- InChI: InChI=1S/C8H7IN2OS/c1-13-8-10-5-7(6-11-8)12-4-2-3-9/h5-6H,4H2,1H3; Key:AKZAGHOFDGJXCC-UHFFFAOYSA-N

Rimoprogin is an antifungal compound.
