= GJA1 =

Protein-coding gene in humans

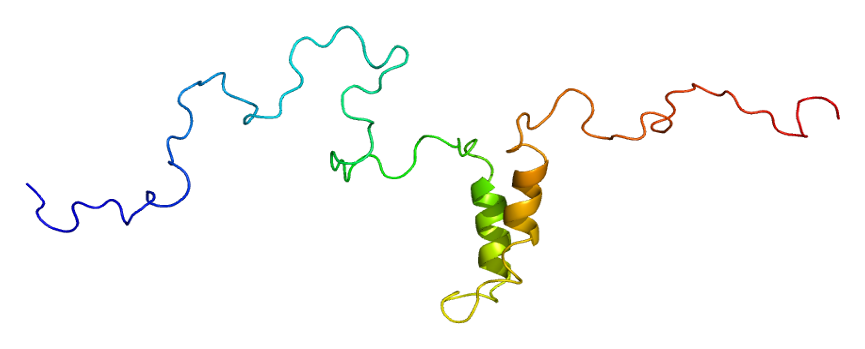

Identifiers
- Aliases: GJA1, AVSD3, CMDR, CX43, EKVP, GJAL, HLHS1, HSS, ODDD, PPKCA, gap junction protein alpha 1, EKVP3
- External IDs: OMIM: 121014; MGI: 95713; GeneCards: GJA1
Available structures
PDB	Ortholog search: PDBe RCSB
PDB	List of PDB id codes 2LL2

Gene location (Human)
Chr.	Chromosome 6 (human)
Band	6q22.31	Start	121,435,595 bp
Band	6q22.31	End	121,449,727 bp

Gene location (Mouse)
Chr.	Chromosome 10 (mouse)
Band	10 B4|10 28.64 cM	Start	56,253,426 bp
Band	10 B4|10 28.64 cM	End	56,278,609 bp
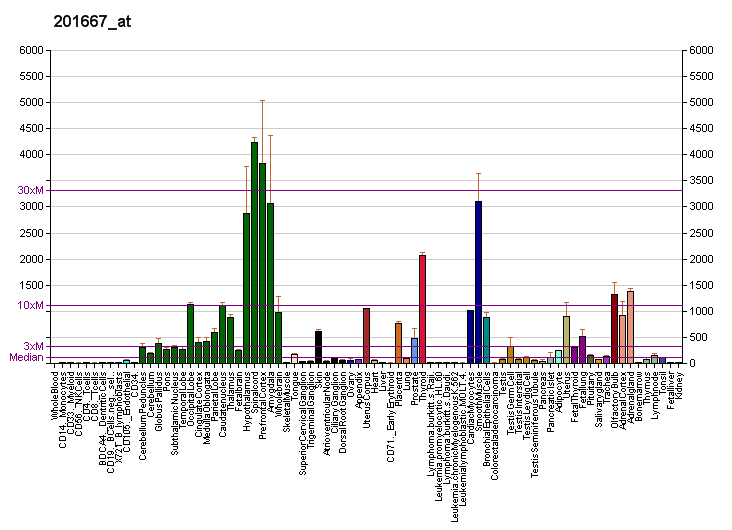
RNA expression pattern
Bgee	Human / Mouse (ortholog); Top expressed in: external globus pallidus; dorsal motor nucleus of vagus nerve; hair follicle; parietal pleura; vulva; human penis; skin of thigh; Region I of hippocampus proper; skin of hip; decidua / Top expressed in: ciliary body; cumulus cell; iris; gastrula; hair follicle; body of femur; molar; decidua; condyle; otic placode; More reference expression data
BioGPS	More reference expression data
Gene ontology
Molecular function	gap junction channel activity involved in cardiac conduction electrical coupling; gap junction channel activity involved in cell communication by electrical coupling; protein domain specific binding; SH3 domain binding; ion transmembrane transporter activity; PDZ domain binding; transmembrane transporter activity; protein binding; connexin binding; gap junction channel activity; signal transducer activity; disordered domain specific binding
Cellular component	cytoplasm; endosome; membrane; focal adhesion; mitochondrion; multivesicular body; mitochondrial outer membrane; endoplasmic reticulum; membrane raft; lysosome; fascia adherens; extracellular exosome; integral component of membrane; late endosome; Golgi apparatus; plasma membrane; early endosome; gap junction; Golgi-associated vesicle membrane; endoplasmic reticulum membrane; Golgi membrane; integral component of plasma membrane; cell junction; connexin complex; intercalated disc
Biological process	muscle contraction; positive regulation of protein catabolic process; regulation of bicellular tight junction assembly; cell communication; cellular response to mechanical stimulus; vascular transport; gap junction assembly; positive regulation of cell communication by chemical coupling; negative regulation of wound healing; negative regulation of cell population proliferation; apoptotic process; development of the heart; negative regulation of cell growth; positive regulation of vasoconstriction; positive regulation of glomerular filtration; negative regulation of cardiac muscle cell proliferation; chronic inflammatory response; neuron projection morphogenesis; response to glucose; response to fluid shear stress; atrial cardiac muscle cell action potential; transmembrane transport; positive regulation of behavioral fear response; negative regulation of DNA biosynthetic process; positive regulation of insulin secretion; regulation of calcium ion transport; ATP transport; positive regulation of cytosolic calcium ion concentration; cell-cell signaling; cell communication by electrical coupling involved in cardiac conduction; response to peptide hormone; negative regulation of endothelial cell proliferation; ion transmembrane transport; protein complex oligomerization; endothelium development; response to pH; positive regulation of I-kappaB kinase/NF-kappaB signaling; signal transduction; response to ischemia; response to lipopolysaccharide; response to retinoic acid; decidualization; cell communication by electrical coupling; epididymis development; regulation of transmembrane transporter activity; cellular response to parathyroid hormone stimulus; transport
Sources:Amigo / QuickGO
Orthologs
Databases	NCBI: entry; OMA: entry
Species	Human	Mouse
Entrez	2697	14609
Ensembl	ENSG00000152661	ENSMUSG00000050953
UniProt	P17302	P23242
RefSeq (mRNA)	NM_000165	NM_010288
RefSeq (protein)	NP_000156	NP_034418
Location (UCSC)	Chr 6: 121.44 – 121.45 Mb	Chr 10: 56.25 – 56.28 Mb
PubMed search
- Wikidata
View/Edit Human	View/Edit Mouse

Connexin43
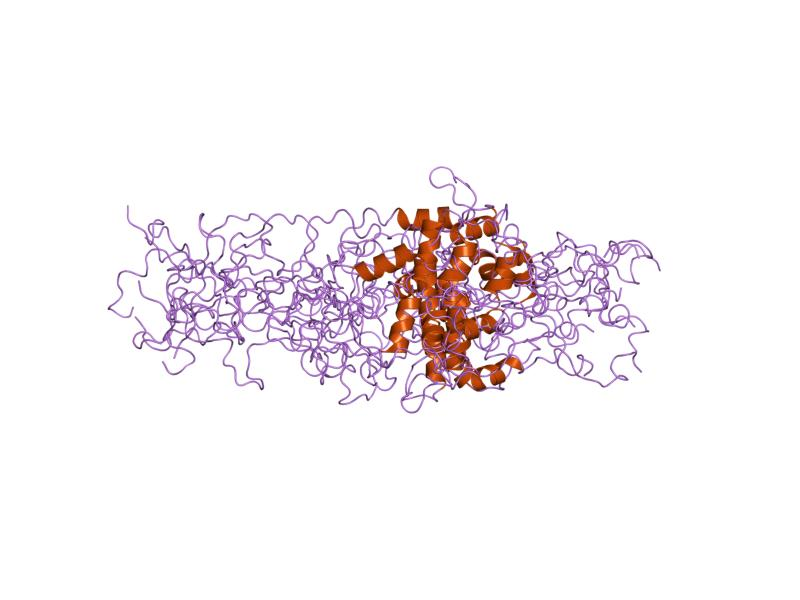
- connexin 43 carboxyl terminal domain

Identifiers
- Symbol: Connexin43
- Pfam: PF03508
- InterPro: IPR013124
- TCDB: 1.A.24
Available protein structures:
- PDB: IPR013124 PF03508 (ECOD; PDBsum)
- AlphaFold: IPR013124; PF03508

Gap junction alpha-1 protein (GJA1), also known as connexin 43 (Cx43), is a protein that in humans is encoded by the GJA1 gene on chromosome 6. As a connexin, GJA1 is a component of gap junctions, which allow for gap junction intercellular communication (GJIC) between cells to regulate cell death, proliferation, and differentiation. As a result of its function, GJA1 is implicated in many biological processes, including muscle contraction, embryonic development, inflammation, and spermatogenesis, as well as diseases, including oculodentodigital dysplasia (ODDD), heart malformations, and cancers.

== Structure ==
GJA1 is a 43.0 kDa protein composed of 382 amino acids. GJA1 contains a long C-terminal tail, an N-terminal domain, and multiple transmembrane domains. The protein passes through the phospholipid bilayer four times, leaving its C- and N-terminals exposed to the cytoplasm. The C-terminal tail is composed of 50 amino acids and includes post-translational modification sites, as well as binding sites for transcription factors, cytoskeleton elements, and other proteins. As a result, the C-terminal tail is central to functions such as regulating pH gating and channel assembly. Notably, the DNA region of the GJA1 gene encoding this tail is highly conserved, indicating that it is either resistant to mutations or becomes lethal when mutated. Meanwhile, the N-terminal domain is involved in channel gating and oligomerization and, thus, may control the switch between the channel's open and closed states. The transmembrane domains form the gap junction channel while the extracellular loops facilitate proper channel docking. Moreover, two extracellular loops form disulfide bonds that interact with two hexamers to form a complete gap junction channel.

The connexin-43 internal ribosome entry site is an RNA element present in the 5' UTR of the mRNA of GJA1. This internal ribosome entry site (IRES) allows cap independent translation during conditions such as heat shock and stress.

Connexin-43 internal ribosome entry site (IRES)
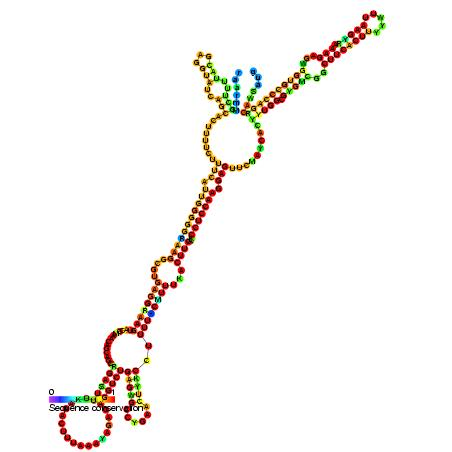
- Predicted secondary structure and sequence conservation of IRES_Cx43

Identifiers
- Symbol: IRES_Cx43
- Rfam: RF00487

Other data
- RNA type: Cis-reg; IRES
- Domain: Eukaryota
- GO: GO:0043022
- SO: SO:0000243
- PDB structures: PDBe

== Function ==
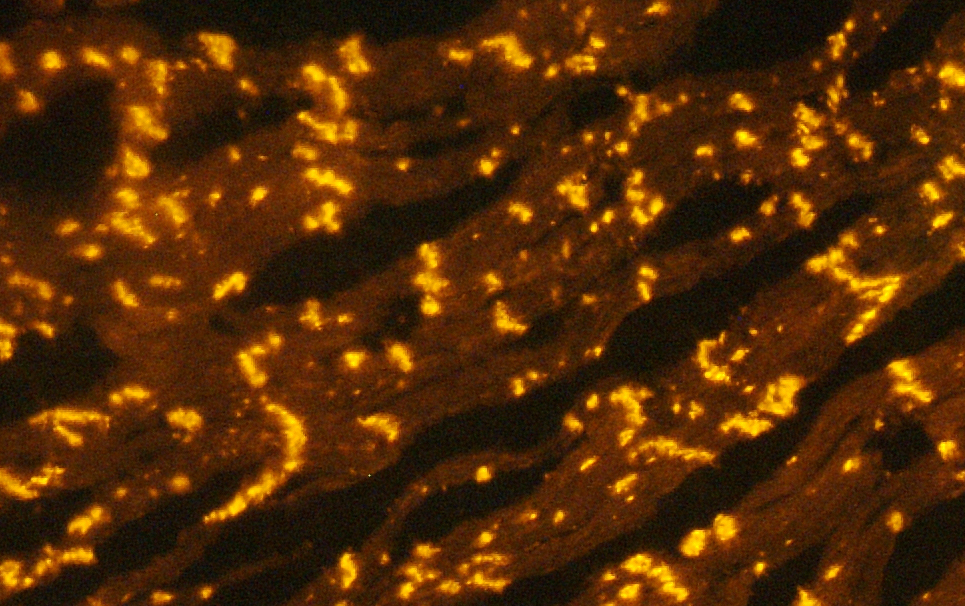
Connexin 43 distribution in the rat myocardium (gap junctions between cardiomyocytes)

As a member of the connexin family, GJA1 is a component of gap junctions, which are intercellular channels that connect adjacent cells to permit the exchange of low molecular weight molecules, such as small ions and secondary messengers, to maintain homeostasis.

GJA1 is the most ubiquitously expressed connexin and is detected in most cell types. It is the major protein in heart gap junctions and is purported to play a crucial role in the synchronized contraction of the heart. Despite its key role in the heart and other vital organs, GJA1 has a short half-life (only two to four hours), indicating that the protein undergoes daily turnover in the heart and may be highly abundant or compensated with other connexins. GJA1 is also largely involved in embryonic development. For instance, transforming growth factor-beta 1 (TGF-β1) was observed to induce GJA1 expression via the Smad and ERK1/2 signaling pathways, resulting in trophoblast cell differentiation into the placenta.

Furthermore, GJA1 is expressed in many immune cells, such as eosinophils and T cells, where its gap junction function promotes the maturation and activation of these cells and, by extension, the cross-communication necessary to mount an inflammatory response. It has also been shown that uterine macrophage directly physically couple with uterine myocytes through GJA1, transferring Ca²⁺, to promote uterine muscle contraction and excitation during human labor onset.

In addition, GJA1 can be found in the Leydig cells and seminiferous tubules between Sertoli cells and spermatogonia or primary spermatocytes, where it plays a key role in spermatogenesis and testis development through controlling the tight junction proteins in the blood-testis barrier.

While it is a channel protein, GJA1 can also perform channel-independent functions. In the cytoplasm, the protein regulates the microtubule network and, by extension, cell migration and polarity. This function has been observed in brain and heart development, as well as wound-healing in endothelial cells. GJA1 has also been observed to localize to the mitochondria, where it promotes cell survival by downregulating the intrinsic apoptotic pathway during conditions of oxidative stress.

== Clinical significance ==
Mutations in this gene have been associated with ODDD; craniometaphyseal dysplasia; sudden infant death syndrome, which is linked to cardiac arrhythmia; Hallermann–Streiff syndrome; and heart malformations, such as viscero-atrial heterotaxia. There have also been a few cases of reported hearing loss and skin disorders unrelated to ODDD. Ultimately, GJA1 has low tolerance for deviations from its original sequence, with mutations resulting in loss- or gain-of-channel function that lead to disease phenotypes. It is paradoxical, however, that patients with an array of somatic mutations in GJA1 most often do not present with cardiac arrhythmias, even though connexin-43 is the most abundant protein forming gap junctional pores in cardiomyocytes and are essential for normal action potential propagation.

Notably, GJA1 expression has been associated with a wide variety of cancers, including nasopharyngeal carcinoma, meningioma, hemangiopericytoma, liver tumor, colon cancer, esophageal cancer, breast cancer, mesothelioma, glioblastoma, lung cancer, adrenocortical tumors, renal cell cancer, cervical carcinoma, ovarian carcinoma, endometrial carcinoma, prostate cancer, thyroid carcinoma, and testicular cancer. Its role in controlling cell motility and polarity was thought to contribute to cancer development and metastasis, though its role as a gap junction protein may also be involved. Moreover, the cytoprotective effects of this protein can promote tumor cell survival in radiotherapy treatments, while silencing its gene increases radiosensitivity. As a result, GJA1 may serve as a target for improving the success of radiotherapeutic treatment of cancer. As a biomarker, GJA1 could also be used to screen young males for risk of testis cancer.

The thyroid hormone triiodothyronine (T3) downregulates the expression of GJA1. This is assumed to be a key mechanism why the conduction velocity in myocardial tissue is reduced in thyrotoxicosis, thereby promoting cardiac arrhythmia.

Currently, only rotigaptide, an antiarrhythmic peptide-based drug, and its derivatives, such as danegaptide, have reached clinical trials for treating cardiac pathologies by enhancing GJA1 expression. Alternatively, drugs could target complementary connexins, such as Cx40, which function similarly to GJA1. However, both approaches still require a system to target the diseased tissue to avoid inducing developmental abnormalities elsewhere. Thus, a more effective approach entails designing a miRNA through antisense oligonucleotides, transfection, or infection to knock down only mutant GJA1 mRNA, thus allowing the expression of wildtype GJA1 and retaining normal phenotype.

== Interactions ==
Gap junction protein, alpha 1 has been shown to interact with:

- Cx37,
- Cx40,
- Cx45,
- MAPK7,
- Caveolin 1,
- Tight junction protein 1
- CSNK1D, and
- PTPmu (PTPRM).

== See also ==
- Connexin
- Hypoplastic left heart syndrome
