= Insulin degludec/insulin aspart =

Combination medication

Combination of
- Insulin degludec: Long-acting human insulin analog
- Insulin aspart: Fast-acting human insulin analog

Clinical data
- Trade names: Ryzodeg
- AHFS/Drugs.com: Professional Drug Facts
- Pregnancy category: AU: B3
- Routes of administration: Subcutaneous injection
- ATC code: A10AD06 (WHO)

Legal status
- Legal status: AU: S4 (Prescription only); EU: Rx-only

Identifiers
- CAS Number: 1392491-77-8
- KEGG: D10570

Insulin degludec/insulin aspart, sold under the brand name Ryzodeg, is a fixed-dose combination medication for the treatment of diabetes mellitus. It contains insulin degludec and insulin aspart. It is given as an injection under the skin in the abdominal wall (at the front of the waist), upper arm or thigh.

The most frequently reported side effect is hypoglycemia (low blood glucose levels).

It was approved for medical use in the European Union in January 2013, and in Australia in November 2017.

== Medical uses ==
Insulin degludec/insulin aspart is indicated for the treatment of diabetes mellitus in adults, adolescents and children from the age of two years.

Insulin degludec and insulin aspart are slightly different from human insulin. The differences mean that insulin degludec is absorbed more slowly by the body. This means it has a long duration of action. Meanwhile, insulin aspart is absorbed faster by the body than human insulin, and therefore it starts to work as soon as it is injected and has a short duration of action.
