= Ritipenem =

Chemical compound

Identifiers
- CAS Number: 84845-57-8
- PubChem CID: 65633
- ChemSpider: 59074
- UNII: D4SL77931L
- ChEMBL: ChEMBL70088
- CompTox Dashboard (EPA): DTXSID60868840

Chemical and physical data
- Formula: C_{10}H_{12}N_{2}O_{6}S
- Molar mass: 288.27 g·mol^{−1}
- 3D model (JSmol): Interactive image
- SMILES: C[C@@H](O)[C@@H]1[C@H]2SC(=C(N2C1=O)C(=O)O)COC(=O)N
- InChI: InChI=1S/C10H12N2O6S/c1-3(13)5-7(14)12-6(9(15)16)4(19-8(5)12)2-18-10(11)17/h3,5,8,13H,2H2,1H3,(H2,11,17)(H,15,16)/t3-,5+,8-/m1/s1; Key:IKQNRQOUOZJHTR-UWBRJAPDSA-N

Ritipenem is a penem class antimicrobial agent. Ritipenem is manufactured by Tanabe Seiyaku in the ritipenem acoxil prodrug form, which can be taken orally . It is not FDA approved in the United States as of 2008.
