= Rotigaptide =

Names
- IUPAC name N-Acetyl-D-tyrosyl-D-prolyl-(4S)-4-hydroxy-D-prolylglycyl-D-alanylglycinamide

Identifiers
CAS Number	355151-12-1
3D model (JSmol)	Interactive image
ChEMBL	ChEMBL450656
ChemSpider	8114558
PubChem CID	9938933
UNII	GFA1W6KO7N
CompTox Dashboard (EPA)	DTXSID80189024
- InChI: InChI=1S/C28H39N7O9/c1-15(25(41)30-12-23(29)39)32-24(40)13-31-26(42)22-11-19(38)14-35(22)28(44)21-4-3-9-34(21)27(43)20(33-16(2)36)10-17-5-7-18(37)8-6-17/h5-8,15,19-22,37-38H,3-4,9-14H2,1-2H3,(H2,29,39)(H,30,41)(H,31,42)(H,32,40)(H,33,36)/t15-,19+,20-,21-,22-/m1/s1 Key: GFJRASPBQLDRRY-TWTQBQJDSA-N; InChI=1S/C28H39N7O9/c1-15(25(41)30-12-23(29)39)32-24(40)13-31-26(42)22-11-19(38)14-35(22)28(44)21-4-3-9-34(21)27(43)20(33-16(2)36)10-17-5-7-18(37)8-6-17/h5-8,15,19-22,37-38H,3-4,9-14H2,1-2H3,(H2,29,39)(H,30,41)(H,31,42)(H,32,40)(H,33,36)/t15-,19+,20-,21-,22-/m1/s1
- SMILES: O=C(N1[C@@H](C(=O)NCC(=O)N[C@@H](C(=O)NCC(=O)N)C)C[C@H](O)C1)[C@@H]3N(C(=O)[C@H](NC(=O)C)Cc2ccc(O)cc2)CCC3

Properties
Chemical formula	C_{28}H_{39}N_{7}O_{9}
Molar mass	617.660 g·mol^{−1}
- Except where otherwise noted, data are given for materials in their standard state (at 25 °C [77 °F], 100 kPa). verify (what is ?) Infobox references

Rotigaptide (ZP-123) is a drug under clinical investigation for the treatment of cardiac arrhythmias – specifically atrial fibrillation. It is a peptide analog that has been shown to increase gap junction intercellular conductance in cardiac muscle cells. Gap junctions are protein channels that are responsible for conducting electrical impulses between cells in the heart to maintain normal rhythm. Gap junction modulation is a promising and novel mechanism of action for the treatment of cardiovascular disorders. Its peptide sequence is Ac-D-Tyr-D-Pro-D-Hyp-Gly-D-Ala-Gly-NH2.

== Indications ==
Rotigaptide is being studied for its antiarrhythmic effects, specifically for treating atrial fibrillation. Atrial fibrillation is an irregular and often rapid heart rhythm. The irregular rhythm, results from abnormal electrical impulses in the heart. The irregularity can be continuous or intermittent. In atrial fibrillation, multiple impulses travel through the atria at the same time. Instead of a coordinated contraction, the atrial contractions are irregular, disorganized and very rapid. These irregular impulses reach the AV node in rapid succession, but not all of them make it past the AV node. Therefore, the ventricles beat slower in an irregular rhythm. The resulting rapid, irregular heartbeat causes an irregular pulse and sometimes a sensation of fluttering in the chest.

== Mechanism of action ==
A gap junction in a cell membrane

The exact mechanism of action of rotigaptide is not completely understood. However, rotigaptide is believed to exert its effects on cardiomyocyte gap junctions through phosphorylation events. Each gap junction is composed of a series of connexons close to each other. Each connexon is made up of 6 functional units (connexins) that associate together to form a channel between adjacent cells. Rotigaptide acts at connexins, preferentially to connexin 43 (Cx43). Treatment with rotigaptide has been shown to activate various protein kinase C (PKC) isoforms to cause the phosphorylation of Cx43, which aids in proper function of the connexon. This allows for a smoother conduction to pass through the myocytes to propagate a synchronous contraction. This has been shown to reduce the occurrence of atrial fibrillation.

== Limitations ==
A potential limitation for this drug is that animals being used for studies are most commonly anesthetized with isoflurane, which has been shown to be a partial gap junction uncoupler and thus would negate the effects of rotigaptide. However, this effect can be only minor, as one study showed that a low dose of isoflurane was kept continuous over the progression of the study, indicating that the dose was not high enough to uncouple rotigaptide. Therefore, it may be unlikely that isoflurane plays a role in the results presented.
