= Ruplizumab =

Monoclonal antibody

Monoclonal antibody
- Type: Whole antibody
- Source: Humanized (from mouse)
- Target: CD154

Clinical data
- Trade names: Antova
- ATC code: none

Identifiers
- CAS Number: 220651-94-5
- ChemSpider: none
- UNII: 562JQF15GN

Ruplizumab (trade name Antova) is a humanized monoclonal antibody intended for the treatment of rheumatic diseases like systemic lupus erythematosus and lupus nephritis. A study showed that the drug was associated with life-threatening thromboembolisms, while another study only found thrombocytopenia.
