= Rosaramicin =

Names
- IUPAC name {(1S,2R,3R,7R,8S,9S,10R,12R,14E,16S)-3-Ethyl-7-hydroxy-2,8,12,16-tetramethyl-5,13-dioxo-9-[3,4,6-trideoxy-3-(dimethylamino)-β-D-xylo-hexopyranosyloxy]-4,17-dioxabicyclo[14.1.0]heptadec-14-en-10-yl}acetaldehyde
- Systematic IUPAC name [(1S,2R,3R,7R,8S,9S,10R,12R,14E,16S)-9-{[(2S,3R,4S,6R)-4-(Dimethylamino)-3-hydroxy-6-methyloxan-2-yl]oxy}-3-ethyl-7-hydroxy-2,8,12,16-tetramethyl-5,13-dioxo-4,17-dioxabicyclo[14.1.0]heptadec-14-en-10-yl]acetaldehyde
- Other names Rosamicin; Juvenimicin A3

Identifiers
CAS Number	35834-26-5
3D model (JSmol)	Interactive image
ChEBI	CHEBI:87084
ChEMBL	ChEMBL8965
ChemSpider	5020508
ECHA InfoCard	100.047.933
EC Number	252-742-1
KEGG	D05757
PubChem CID	6537204
UNII	E907BNQ7SH
CompTox Dashboard (EPA)	DTXSID4046361
- InChI: InChI=1S/C31H51NO9/c1-9-25-20(5)29-31(6,41-29)12-10-23(34)17(2)14-21(11-13-33)28(19(4)24(35)16-26(36)39-25)40-30-27(37)22(32(7)8)15-18(3)38-30/h10,12-13,17-22,24-25,27-30,35,37H,9,11,14-16H2,1-8H3/b12-10+/t17-,18-,19+,20-,21+,22+,24-,25-,27-,28-,29+,30+,31+/m1/s1 Key: IUPCWCLVECYZRV-JZMZINANSA-N; InChI=1/C31H51NO9/c1-9-25-20(5)29-31(6,41-29)12-10-23(34)17(2)14-21(11-13-33)28(19(4)24(35)16-26(36)39-25)40-30-27(37)22(32(7)8)15-18(3)38-30/h10,12-13,17-22,24-25,27-30,35,37H,9,11,14-16H2,1-8H3/b12-10+/t17-,18-,19+,20-,21+,22+,24-,25-,27-,28-,29+,30+,31+/m1/s1 Key: IUPCWCLVECYZRV-JZMZINANBR
- SMILES: O=CC[C@@H]2[C@H](O[C@@H]1O[C@@H](C[C@H](N(C)C)[C@H]1O)C)[C@@H](C)[C@H](O)CC(=O)O[C@H](CC)[C@@H](C)[C@@H]3O[C@]3(\C=C\C(=O)[C@H](C)C2)C

Properties
Chemical formula	C_{31}H_{51}NO_{9}
Molar mass	581.747 g·mol^{−1}
- Except where otherwise noted, data are given for materials in their standard state (at 25 °C [77 °F], 100 kPa). Infobox references

Rosaramicin (rosamicin) is an antibacterial substance that is chemically a lipid-soluble basic macrolide similar to erythromycin but with a better activity against Gram-negative bacteria.

Experiments in dogs have shown that it is more concentrated in the prostate than erythromycin is, and thus may be better for treating infections of that organ.
