= Pharmacological cardiotoxicity =

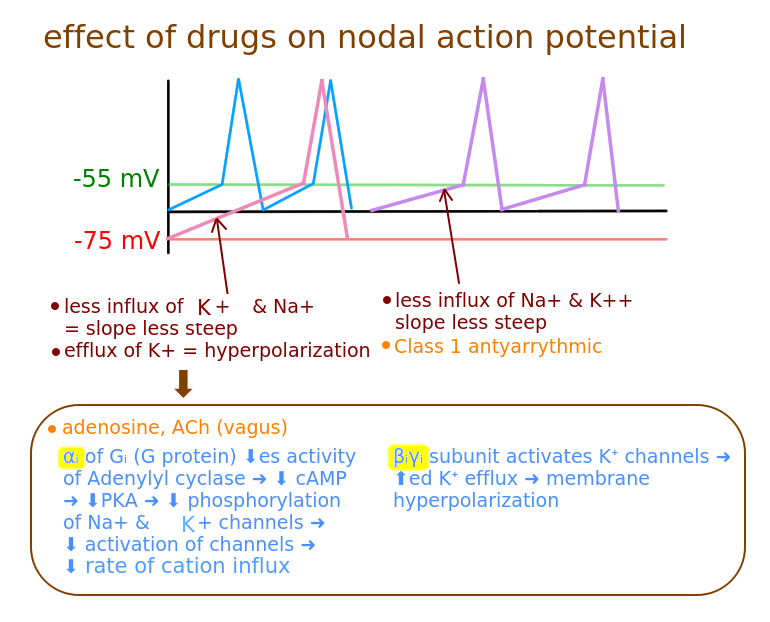
The therapeutic effects of antiarrhymatics may also potentiate cardiotoxicity

Pharmacological cardiotoxicity is defined as cardiac damage that occurs under the action of a drug. This can occur both through damage of cardiac muscle as well as through alteration of the ion currents of cardiomyocytes.

Two distinct drug classes in which cardiotoxicity can occur are in anti-cancer and antiarrhythmic drugs. Anti-cancer drug classes that cause cardiotoxicity include anthracyclines, monoclonal antibodies, and antimetabolites. This form generally manifests as a progressive form of heart failure, but can also manifest as an harmful arrhythmia. In contrast, in antiarrhythmic drugs, cardiotoxicity is due to a risk of arrhythmias resulting from treated-induced ion current imbalance.

Other types of drugs are also known for cardiotoxicity, such as clozapine being associated with myocarditis.

== Anticancer cardiotoxicity ==
The cardiotoxicity of anticancer drugs has been well documented, with an entire sub-speciality of cardio-oncology dedicated towards investigating and treating these serious side effects. Two well known anticancer drug families that cause cardiotoxicity are anthracyclines and monoclonal antibodies targeting HER2. Other types of anticancer drugs that can lead to cardiotoxicity include alkylating agents such as cyclophosphamide, BCR-ABL1 targeting receptor tyrosine kinases such as imatinib, and VEGF antibodies such as bevicizumab. This section of the article will focus on anthracyclines and HER2 monoclonal antibodies due to the prominence of cardiotoxicity in these compounds.

=== Pathophysiology ===
The mechanism of anthracycline-induced cardiotoxicity is unknown and is under active research. However, multiple theories exist. One well supported mechanism is related to the production of superoxide anion radicals that in turn damage cardiac myocytes. Recent research suggests that Top2b (topoisomerase-IIβ) helps mediate the production of oxygen radicals, representing a potential biomarker for this serious side effect. Other proposed mechanisms include interference with cardiac ATP production, mitochondria-related stress, and lipid peroxidation.

On the other hand, the mechanism of HER2 antibody cardiotoxicity is more well known. HER2 is a protein expressed on the cell membranes of HER2 positive breast cancer cells. However, HER2 is also expressed on the surface of cardiac myocytes. It is hypothesized that HER2 expressed in these cardiac cells have a cardioprotective mechanism, and the targeting of these proteins in this context leads to the cardiotoxicity associated with HER2 monoclonal antibodies.

=== Clinical Manifestation and Epidemiology ===
The cardiotoxicity of anthracyclines can be classified into three categories: early, early onset chronic, and late onset chronic. Early cardiotoxicity is rare, but manifests as arrthymias, myocarditis, and pericarditis. This type of toxicity occurs directly after treatment with anthracycline. Early onset chronic cardiotoxicity is defined as cardiotoxicity manifesting within one year of the completion of treatment, while late onset chronic cardiotoxicity occurs after one year. The cardiotoxicity of anthracyclines is dose dependent. At total exposure levels lower than 400 mg/m2, the incidence of heart failure is between 3%-5%. At a exposure rate of 700 mg/m2, the heart failure rate is at 48%.

Cardiotoxicity involving HER2 monoclonal antibodies manifests as decrease left ventricular ejection fraction and resulting heart failure. The cardiotoxicity of HER2 monoclonal antibodies is dose independent.

=== Treatments ===
The immediate intervention for the development of cardiotoxicity is discontinuation of the drug. Preventative measures for anthracycline induced cardiomyopathy include dexrazoxane, which is the only preventative drug approved by the FDA for prevention of anthracycline cardiomyopathy. Overall, there are no specific treatments targeted towards the cardiotoxicity of anticancer drugs. Rather, treatment is of the resultant heart failure. This often takes the form of ACE inhibitors or beta blockers.

== Antiarrhymic cardiotoxicity ==
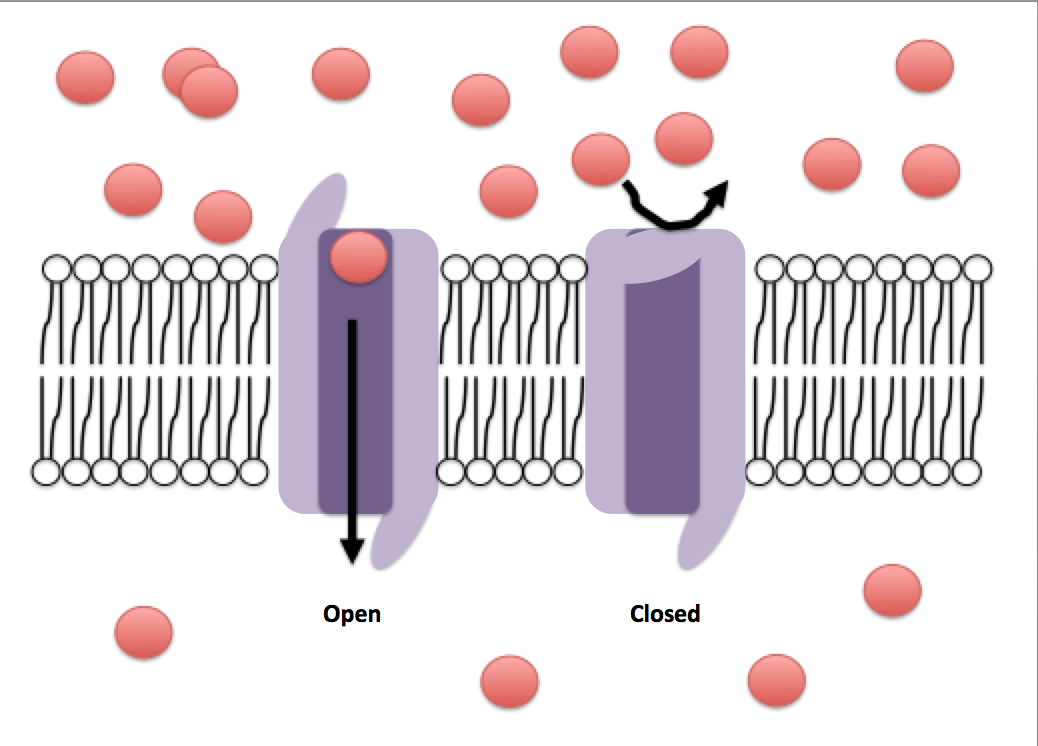
Representation of the ion channel opening/closing that antiarrhythmics act upon

Antiarrhythmics are broad class of drugs that are used treat heart rhythm irregularities. Utilizing the Vaughan-Williams (VW) system, antiarrhymic drugs are classified into four main classes based on their mechanism of action. Class I antiarrhymics lead to blockage of sodium channels. Class II antiarrhymatics are beta-adrenoceptor blockers. Class III antiarrhymics act as potassium channel blockers, while Class IV antiarrhymics are non-dihydropyridine calcium channel blockers. While the effects of these drugs may be antiarrhymic, they can also be proarrhymic in other contexts.

=== Pathophysiology ===
The pharmacological cardiotoxicity of antiarrhymic compounds is related to their electrophysiological mechanism. In particular, because antiarrhymics drugs act on the opening/closing of ion channels, the modification of the electrical currents can lead to adverse cardiac events such torsade de pointes or ventricular fibrillation. Due to the case-by-case basis in which these medication lead to cardiotoxicity and the development of specific adverse rhythms, it has become increasingly important to assess compounds in a preclinical environment (See Pharmacological cardiotoxicity#In Silico Cardiotoxicity Assessment).

=== Clinical Manifestation and Epidemiology ===
The manifestation of antiarrhymic cardiotoxicity may manifest as worsening of the pre-existent arrhythmia or the development of a new arrhythmia.

Female sex at birth has been associated with an increased risk of the development of new arrhythmia, and other risk factors include age, kidney disease, drug-drug interactions, and other underlying heart problems.

=== Treatment ===
Like with anticancer drugs, the most common intervention for the development of cardiotoxicity is discontinuation of the causative drug. Individual risk factors, such as risk of arrhythmia re-emergence, are considered when deciding final courses of action. Adjacent devices, such as pacemakers, or ablation therapy may also be considered as alternatives to medical treatment for the primary arrhythmia.

The treatment of torsade de pointes is typically with intravenous magnesium sulfate, which helps stabilize cardiac membranes. For ventricular fibrillation cases, either/or defibrillation, amiodarone, or epinephrine is used dependent on the ACLS algorithm.

== In silico cardiotoxicity assessment ==
=== Background ===
In the last years, in silico models have aided scientists and clinicians to cure several diseases. Computational modeling in particular has helped scientists to alter parameters that otherwise could have not been investigated.

In the field of electrophysiology, pharmacological cardiotoxicity can be carried out by leveraging specific computational models. Recently, it has become possible to analyze the pharmacological effect on atria and ventricles separately.

Since the two cardiac chambers are very different each other and play a key role both on a functional and anatomical basis, suitable computational models have to be accounted for to describe their different behavior. During the years, several models have been developed to best characterize and replicate the cellular action potential behavior of the most relevant anatomical region of the heart, such as Courtemanche model for atria or O'Hara model for ventricles.

=== Creation of a population of cellular action potentials ===
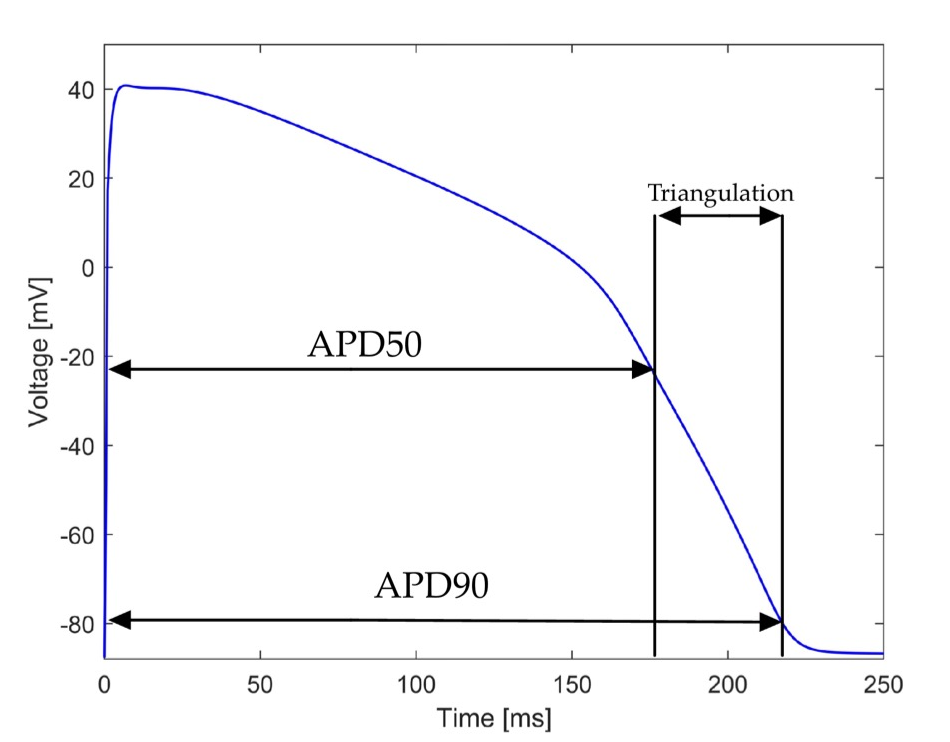
Ventricular Action Potential

In this way, it has been possible to create a virtual cellular population of cardiomyocytes and vary their conductances that are related to the main ionic currents which contribute to the action potential morphology, and is reflective of a specific anatomical region of the heart.

In order to create a stable population of cellular action potentials, several biomarkers have been developed to best characterize the instability of cellular action potentials. Examples of biomarkers reported include:

- APD90: it represents the action potential duration when the phase of the repolarization is at 90%, so it is possible to associate to this value a time and it can be expressed as:

$APD_{90}=t_{90}-t_0$

- APD90: it represents the action potential duration when the phase of the repolarization is at 50%, so it is possible to associate to this value a time and it can be expressed as:

$APD_{50}=t_{50}-t_0$

- APD20: it represents the action potential duration when the phase of the repolarization is at 20%, so it is possible to associate to this value a time and it can be expressed as:

$APD_{20}=t_{20}-t_0$

- Triangulation: it is a measure of how triangular is an action potential, expressed as:

$Triangulation=APD_{90}-APD_{50}$

- APA: it represents the action potential amplitude, expressed as:

$APA=V_{Max}-V_0$

=== Regional clusterization ===
Once the cellular population is stable, all action potential are then compared to physiological data related to the most relevant anatomical regions to appropriately filter the action potential, aiming to consider just the physiologically relevant ones.

At the atrial level, clusterization occurs with data associated to:

- Right atrium
- Right atrial appendage
- Left atrium
- Left atrial appendage
- Atrioventricular rings
- Crista terminalis
- Right Bachmann's bundle
- Left Bachmann's bundle
- Pectinate muscles

=== Simulation of the pharmacological action ===
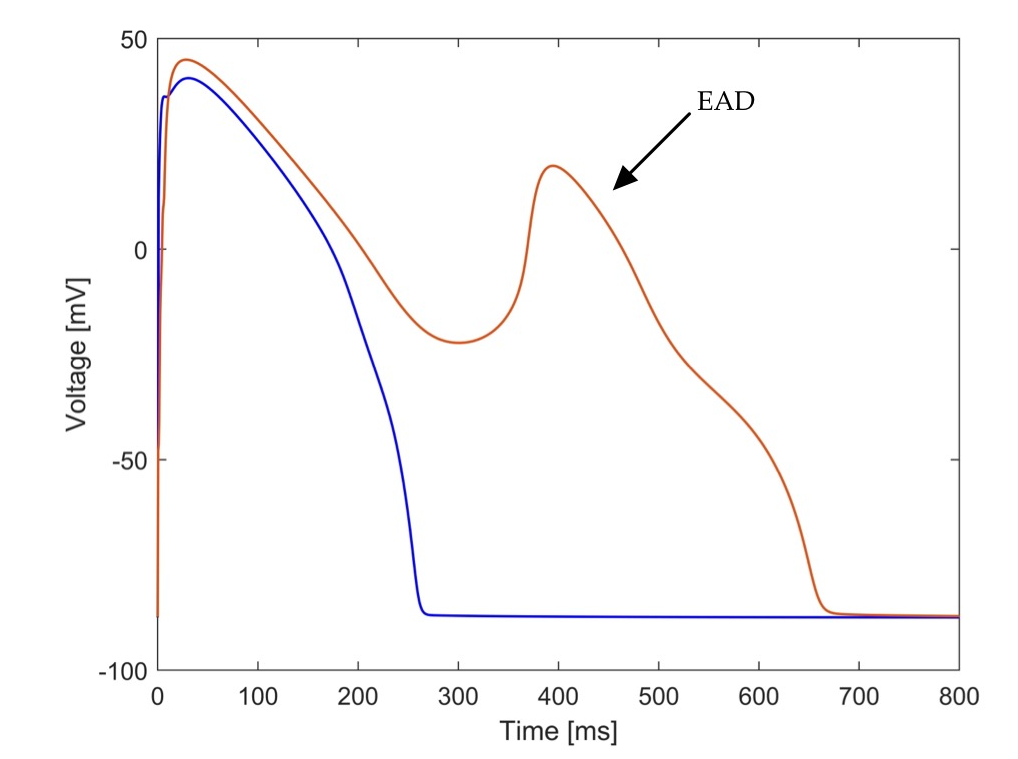
Early afterdepolarization

According to pharmacokinetic and pharmacodynamic ideals, pharmacological action is integrated in the model. By means of specific electrical stimuli protocols, the pharmacological effect of a new drug can be investigated in a completely safe, and controlled computational environment, providing preliminary important considerations concerning the cardiotoxicity of new pharmacological compounds.

According to the outcome of the simulations, several aspects can be investigated to identify the proarrhythmicity of a new pharmacological compound. The typical changes, known as repolarization abnormalities, that are considered pro-arrhythmic include:

- Early afterdepolarization
- Electrical alternans
- Repolarization failures

=== Torsade de point risk score ===
Simulation can be carried out at different effective plasmatic therapeutic level of the drugs to identify the level at which cardiotoxicity cannot be neglected. The data collected could be finally managed to create a score system aimed to define the torsadogenic risk, namely the risk of inducing torsade de pointes, of the new drugs.

A possible torsade de point risk score to assess cardiotoxicity could be: $TdPRS=\frac{\sum_{c}(W_c\cdot nRA_c)}{N\cdot \sum_{c}W_c)}$

where $\sum_{c}$ is the sum of all concentrations, [C] is the concentration taken into account, $W_c=\frac{EFTPC}{[C]}$ , $N$ is the total number of models in the population, and $nRA_c$ represents the number of models showing repolarization abnormalities.

=== Tissue simulations ===
More detailed computation simulations can be carried out accounting for not cellular models, but taking into consideration the functional syncytium and enabling the cells to mutually interact, the so-called electrotonic coupling.

In case of tissue simulation or in wider cases, such as in whole organ simulations, all the cellular models are note applicable anymore, and several corrections have to be made. Firstly, the governing equations can not be just ordinary differential equations, but a system of partial differential equations has to be accounted for. A suitable choice may be the monodomain model:

$\triangledown \cdot(D\nabla V)=(C_m\frac{\partial V}{\partial t} + I_{ion}(V,u))$ $in$ $\Omega$

$n \cdot(D\nabla V)=0$ $in$ $\partial \Omega$

where $D$ is the effective conductivity tensor, $C_m$is the capacitance of the cellular membrane, $I_{ion}$ the transmembrane ionic current, $\Omega$ and $\partial\Omega$ are the domain of interest and its boundary, respectively, with $n$ the outward boundary of $\partial\Omega$.

== See also ==
- Arrhythmias
- Cardiology
- Electrophysiology
- Pharmacology
