= Robatumumab =

Chemical compound

Monoclonal antibody
- Type: Whole antibody
- Source: Human
- Target: CD221

Clinical data
- ATC code: none

Identifiers
- CAS Number: 934235-44-6
- ChemSpider: none
- UNII: V983921H3B
- KEGG: D10056

Chemical and physical data
- Formula: C_{6418}H_{9960}N_{1732}O_{1992}S_{42}
- Molar mass: 144602.93 g·mol^{−1}

Robatumumab (proposed INN; also known as SCH 717454 and MK-7454) is a monoclonal antibody and an antineoplastic by Merck and Schering-Plough. It binds to CD221, the insulin-like growth factor 1 receptor.

Phase 2 clinical trials in patients with colorectal cancer, osteosarcoma and Ewing sarcoma are complete. Merck has since discontinued development.
