= Ronactolol =

Names
- IUPAC name N-[4-[2-Hydroxy-3-(propan-2-ylamino)propoxy]phenyl]-4-methoxybenzamide

Identifiers
| CAS Number | 90895-85-5 |
| 3D model (JSmol) | Interactive image |
| ChemSpider | 59236 |
| PubChem CID | 65824 |
| UNII | PJ691WQY08 |
| CompTox Dashboard (EPA) | DTXSID20869070 |
- InChI: InChI=1S/C20H26N2O4/c1-14(2)21-12-17(23)13-26-19-10-6-16(7-11-19)22-20(24)15-4-8-18(25-3)9-5-15/h4-11,14,17,21,23H,12-13H2,1-3H3,(H,22,24) Key: BPNZFFWEUGGXMC-UHFFFAOYSA-N; InChI=1/C20H26N2O4/c1-14(2)21-12-17(23)13-26-19-10-6-16(7-11-19)22-20(24)15-4-8-18(25-3)9-5-15/h4-11,14,17,21,23H,12-13H2,1-3H3,(H,22,24) Key: BPNZFFWEUGGXMC-UHFFFAOYAI
- SMILES: CC(C)NCC(COC1=CC=C(C=C1)NC(=O)C2=CC=C(C=C2)OC)O

Properties
| Chemical formula | C_{20}H_{26}N_{2}O_{4} |
| Molar mass | 358.438 g·mol^{−1} |
- Except where otherwise noted, data are given for materials in their standard state (at 25 °C [77 °F], 100 kPa). Infobox references

Ronactolol is a beta adrenergic receptor antagonist.
