= Rindopepimut =

Injectable peptide cancer vaccine

Rindopepimut (CDX-110) is an injectable peptide cancer vaccine which targets a mutant protein called EGFRvIII present in about 25% to 30% of glioblastoma cases.

The vaccine consists of the EGFRv3-specific peptide (a 13-amino acid mutant vIII epitope) conjugated to the non-specific immunomodulator keyhole limpet hemocyanin (KLH).

The US FDA granted it Breakthrough Therapy designation for glioblastoma in Feb 2015 meaning that it might be able to get approval sooner if it is effective.

== Clinical trials ==
=== Glioblastoma ===
The phase II ACT III study reported encouraging results in June 2015.

The ReACT clinical trial for glioblastoma reported encouraging results in 2015.

In March 2016, the phase III ACT IV trial was terminated because it did not increase overall survival.
