= Connexon =

Protein hexamer that forms the pore of gap junctions between cells

- Connexon and connexin structure

Details

Identifiers
- Latin: connexona
- TH: H1.00.01.1.02025

In biology, a connexon, also known as a connexin hemichannel, is an assembly of six proteins called connexins that form the pore for a gap junction between the cytoplasm of two adjacent cells. This channel allows for bidirectional flow of ions and signaling molecules. The connexon is the hemichannel supplied by a cell on one side of the junction; two connexons from opposing cells normally come together to form the complete intercellular gap junction channel. In some cells, the hemichannel itself is active as a conduit between the cytoplasm and the extracellular space, allowing the transference of ions and small molecules lower than 1-2 KDa. Little is known about this function of connexons besides the new evidence suggesting their key role in intracellular signaling. In still other cells connexons have been shown to occur in mitochondrial membranes and appear to play a role in heart ischaemia.

Connexons made of the same type of connexins are considered homomeric, while connexons made of differing types of connexins are heteromeric.

== Structure ==
=== Assembly ===
The assembly of connexins destined for gap junction plaques begins with synthesis of connexins within the cell and ends with the formation of gap junction channel plaques on the cell membrane. The connexin subunit proteins that make up connexons are synthesized on the membranes of the cell's endoplasmic reticulum. These subunits are then oligomerized, or combined with other smaller parts, into connexons in the golgi apparatus. The connexons are then delivered to their proper location on the plasma membrane. Connexons then dock with compatible connexons from the neighboring cell to form gap junction channel plaques. A large part of this process is mediated by phosphorylation of different enzymes and proteins, allowing and preventing interaction between certain proteins. The connexons forming channels to the cell exterior or in mitochondria will require a somewhat altered path of assembly.

=== General ===
Connexons contribute to the formation of gap junctions, and are an essential component of the electric synapses in neural pathways. In a single gap junction, connexons will assemble around an aqueous porous membrane, forming a hemi-channel that is composed of connexins. Connexins are the smaller protein molecules that make up connexons and play a crucial part to the formation of gap junctions. Structurally, connexins are made up of 4 alpha helical transmembrane domains connected by two extracellular loops and one cytoplasmic loop, while both N and C terminals reside intracellularly. Connexin types can be further differentiated by using their predicted molecular weight (ex: Connexin 43 is Cx 43 due to its molecular weight of 43 kDa). Connexons will form the gap junction by docking a hemi-channel to another hemi-channel in an adjacent cell membrane. During this phase, the formation of intercellular channels spanning both of the plasma membranes occurs. Subsequently, this process leads to a better understanding of how electric synapses are facilitated between neurons. Early research identified connexons through their presence in gap junctions. Since then, connexons have been increasingly detected forming channels in single membranes considerably broadening their functionality in cells and tissues.

=== Degradation ===
Connexon structure is degraded by its removal from the plasma membrane. Connexons will be internalized by the cell itself as a double membrane channel structure (due to the docking of hemi-channels). This is called internalization or endocytosis. Research suggests that gap junctions in general may be internalized using more than one method, but the best known and most studied would be that of clathrin-mediated endocytosis. In simple terms this process consists of a ligand binding to a receptor signaling for a certain part of the membrane to be coated in clathrin. This part of the membrane then buds into the cell forming a vesicle. Now present in the cell membrane, connexons will be degraded by lysosomal pathways. Lysosomes are able to break down the proteins of the connexon because they contain specific enzymes that are made specifically for this process. It is thought that ubiquitination signals degradation within the cell.

== Cellular functions ==
=== Properties ===
The properties of individual connexin proteins determine the overall properties of the whole connexon channel. The permeability and selectivity of the channels is determined by its width as well as the molecular selectivity of connexins such as charge selectivity. Research shows connexons are particularly permeable to soluble second messengers, amino acids, nucleotides, ions and glucose. Channels are also voltage sensitive. The connexon channels have voltage-dependent gates that open or close depending on the difference in voltage between the interiors of the two cells. Gates can also show voltage sensitivity depending on the difference in voltage from the interior and exterior of the cell (i.e. membrane potential).

=== Modulation ===
Communication between gap-junctions can be modulated/regulated in many ways. The main types of modulation are:

- Chemical – one common type of chemical modulation is through the interaction of Ca^{2+} and certain domains of connexins. It is not completely understood, however, it is suggested that this interaction causes Ca^{2+} to block the pore of the channel. Another form of chemical modulation is through the response of the channel to acidification (decrease of intracellular pH). It has been found that intracellular acidification causes a change in the C-terminal domain of connexins which then reduces the channel activity.
- Protein Phosphorylation – protein phosphorylation regulates the communication between channels in multiple ways by controlling: connexin trafficking from the Golgi Apparatus, accumulation of connexons to certain areas, and degradation of unnecessary channels. The process of these actions is very complex but involvement of protein phosphorylation is known.
- Humoral – humoral modulation of gap junction communication is done through many biomolecules such as neurotransmitters, growth factors, and various bioactive compounds. Neurotransmitters such as epinephrine and norepinephrine work in neuronal gap-junctions causing propagation of action potentials down neurons. These types of gap-junctions with this type of modulation are often found in neurons in cardiac tissue and vertebrate retina.

== Overall functions ==
Connexons play an imperative role in behavior and neurophysiology. Many of the details surrounding their pathological functions remain unknown as research has only begun recently. In the central nervous system (CNS), connexons play a major role in conditions such as epilepsy, ischemia, inflammation, and neurodegeneration. The molecular mechanism as to how connexons play a role in the conditions listed above has yet to be fully understood and is under further research. Along with their key role in the CNS, connexons are crucial in the functioning of cardiac tissues. The direct connection allows for quick and synchronized firing of neurons in the heart which explains the ability for the heart to beat quickly and change its rate in response to certain stimuli. Connexons also play an essential role in cell development. Specifically, their role in neurogenesis dealing with brain development as well as brain repair during certain diseases/pathologies and also assisting in both cell division as well as cell proliferation. The mechanism by which connexons aid in these processes is still being researched however, it is currently understood that this mechanism involves purinergic signaling (form of extracellular signaling mediated by purine nucleotides and nucleosides such as adenosine and ATP) and permeability to ATP. Other important roles of connexons are glucose sensing and signal transduction. Connexons cause changes in extracellular glucose concentrations affecting feeding/satiety behavior, sleep-wake cycles, and energy use. Further studies indicate that there is an increase in glucose uptake mediated by connexons (whose mechanism is still not fully understood) and under times of high stress and inflammation. Recent research also indicates that connexons may affect synaptic plasticity, learning, memory, vision, and sensorimotor gating.

== Related diseases ==
Some of the diseases associated with connexons are cardiovascular disease and diabetes, which is the inability of the body to produce insulin for glucose uptake by cells and degradation in the smaller units of connexons, called connexins, possibly leading to the onset of heart disease. Cardiovascular disease and diabetes, type I and II, affects similar locations within cells of the heart and pancreas. This location is the gap junction, where connexons facilitate rapid cell-to-cell interactions via electrical transmissions. Gap junctions are often present at nerve endings such as in cardiac muscle and are important in maintaining homeostasis in the liver and proper function of the kidneys. The gap junction itself is a structure that is a specialized transmembrane protein formed by a connexon hemichannel. Cardiovascular disease and possibly type I and II diabetes, are each associated with a major protein connexin that makes up the gap junction.

In cardiovascular disease, Cx43 (connexin 43), a subunit of a connexon, is a general protein of the gap junction stimulating cardio myocyte muscle cells of intercalated discs facilitating synchronized beating of the heart. In the occurrence of cardiovascular disease the Cx43 subunit begins to show signs of oxidative stress, the ability of the heart to counteract the buildup of harmful toxins due to age or diet leading to reduced vascular functions. Additionally, reduced Cx43 expression in vascular tissue, which plays a part in ventricular remolding and healing of wounds after a myocardial infarction, are present in structural heart disease. However, the mechanisms of Cx43 in the heart are still poorly understood. Overall, these changes in Cx43 expression and oxidant stress can lead to abnormalities in the coordinated beating of the heart, predisposing it to cardiac arrhythmias.

Connexons are also associated with both Type I and Type II diabetes. Cx36 (connexin 36) subunit mediates insulin excretion and glucose-induced insulin release from gap junctions of the liver and pancreas. Homeostasis in the liver and pancreatic organs are supported by an intricate system of cellular interactions called endocrine signaling. The secretion of hormones into the blood stream to target distant organs. However, endocrine signaling in the pancreas and liver operates along short distances in the cellular membrane by way of signaling pathways, ion channels, G-protein coupled receptors, tyrosine-kinase receptors, and cell-to-cell contact. The gap junctions in these tissues supported by endocrine signaling arbitrate intracellular signals between cells and larger organ systems by connecting adjacent cells to each other in a tight fit. The Tight fit of the gap junction is such that cells in the tissue can communicate more efficiently and maintain homeostasis. Thus the purpose of the gap junction is to regulate the passage of ions, nutrients, metabolites, second messengers, and small biological molecules. In diabetes the subsequent loss or degradation of Cx36 substantially inhibits insulin production in the pancreas and glucose in the liver which is vital for the production of energy for the entire body. A deficiency of Cx36 adversely affects the ability of the gap junction to operate within these tissues leading a reduction in function and possible disease. Similar symptoms associated with the loss or degradation of the gap junction have been observed in type II diabetes, however, the function of Cx36 in Type 1 and type II diabetes in humans is still unknown. Additionally, the Cx36 connexin is coded for by GJD2 gene, which has a predisposition on the gene locus for type II diabetes, and diabetic syndrome.
