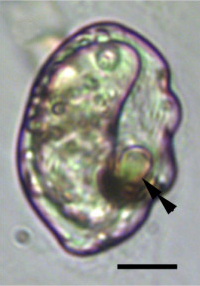
- Light micrograph of a single Warnowia isolate, with a double arrow pointing to the ocelloid

Scientific classification
- Domain: Eukaryota
- Clade: Sar
- Clade: Alveolata
- Division: Dinoflagellata
- Class: Dinophyceae
- Order: Gymnodiniales
- Family: Warnowiaceae
- Genus: Warnowia; Lindemann, 1928

Type species
- Warnowia fusus (Schütt) Lindemann (originally Pouchetia fusus)

= Warnowia =

Genus of single-celled organisms

Warnowia is a genus of athecate dinoflagellates, characterized by having a very sophisticated photoreceptor organelle called the ocelloid. This genus is dispersed worldwide but is scarce and difficult to find and nearly impossible to culture. As a result, the history and taxonomy of this genus are confusing at best, and many basic characteristics like its life cycle are still unknown. Still, Warnowia has drawn scientific interest as a unicellular organism with a fascinatingly complex photoreceptor system.

== History of knowledge ==
The first description of the genus was in 1895 by Schütt, who called it Pouchetia, and designated the type species Pouchetia fusus. In 1921, Kofoid & Swezy described many new species of Pouchetia in a collection of notes on free-living athecate dinoflagellates. Although today it is commonly believed that many of the species described by Kofoid & Swezy are conspecific, their thorough and numerable descriptions of marine protists remain an admirable feat and a useful resource. It was not until 1928 that the genus Warnowia was born, through the redesignation of many of the species in the genus Pouchetia by Lindemann. Consequently, the type species Pouchetia fusus was renamed Warnowia fusus. In 1930, a new species of Warnowia (Warnowia dohrnii) was described by Zimmermann, indicating that the genus had been generally accepted in the scientific canon by that time. In 1933, Schiller, like Lindemann before him, reclassified many of the remaining species in the Pouchetia genus as Warnowia. The remaining Pouchetia species that were not classified as Warnowia were incorporated into the genera Protopsis, Nematodinium, and Erythropsidinium. Today, the Pouchetia genus name is not accepted taxonomically, and is instead referred to as Nematodinium. In the 1970s and '80s it was recognized that some organisms that had been designated species of Protopsis might have been life-cycle stages of Warnowia, and that Proterythropsis was congeneric with Warnowia. In 2005, Gómez incorporated the genus Protopsis into Warnowia in his list of free-living marine dinoflagellates, and the genus finally reached the form that is currently accepted.

== Habitat and ecology ==
Warnowia is abundant in coastal and pelagic waters worldwide. The distribution of this genus stretches from warm temperate and tropical seas to the more northerly waters receiving warm currents from these warmer regions. In Europe, Warnowia has been sampled from the English Channel, Bay of Biscay, Mediterranean Sea and Nordic Seas. In North America, Warnowia has been isolated off of the western coast of Vancouver Island and off of the eastern coast of Massachusetts. Warnowia has also been collected from the southwest Atlantic Ocean, off the coast of Argentina. Warnowia falls into the category of picoplankton, which constitutes a part of the picoeukaryotes community, and fills the ecological role of micro-consumers. Warnowia is rarely encountered in environmental samples. In addition to being found in coastal waters worldwide, Warnowia has a dynamic role in the planktonic community of the oligotrophic, nutrient-poor Sargasso Sea. Warnowia represents a dominant component of the protists present in springtime in the Sargasso Sea. In the summer, Warnowia is still present but is not the dominant group. Seasonal shifts in Warnowia and other protists indicate a complex recycling food web in the Sargasso Sea, which helps to mitigate the low-nutrient availability of the open ocean. The presence of Warnowia in nutrient-rich coastal ecosystems as well as nutrient-poor pelagic ones suggests that it can survive under a wide range of nutrient availabilities, though it is unknown how they can be so dynamic.

== Description of organism ==
=== Morphology and anatomy ===
Warnowia is a genus of heterotrophic athecate, or unarmored, dinoflagellates. Some species of Warnowia are mixotrophic, so plastids (chloroplasts) may or may not be present. They are unicellular, medium to very large (30-150 μm long) biflagellated cells. The cingulum, the groove-like structure that runs around the equator of the organism, makes more than one loop, up to three. Consequently, the sulcus, the groove that runs between the two hemispheres of the organism from the center of one side towards the posterior end of the cell, is twisted. Like other dinoflagellates, in Warnowia, one flagellum (the transverse flagellum) circles the cingulum and the other (the longitudinal flagellum) lies along the sulcus and trails behind the cell. Warnowia is characterized by a conspicuous photoreceptor organelle called the ocelloid located in the middle or posterior of the cell and directed ventral to anteriorly. Trichocysts, nematocysts, and pistons are absent, separating Warnowia from the closely related genera Nematodinium, Proterythropsis and Erythropsidinium. A tentacle-like posterior extension may or may not be present. The broad variation of apical groove, cingulum, sulcus, and ocelloid morphology suggests that the Warnowia genus may be an artificial assemblage of species rather than a genus, though this has yet to be confirmed by molecular phylogenetics. The nucleus is of the dinokaryon type, with continuously condensed chromosomes as in other Dinokaryote dinoflagellates, and located in the middle or upper half of the cell.

=== The ocelloid ===
The ocelloid is a multilayered photoreceptor that is made up of subcellular components and is homologous to simpler eyespots found in other lineages of dinoflagellates. The structure of the ocelloid is highly reminiscent of multicellular camera eyes that evolved independently in different lineages of metazoans, with a lens-like component that focuses light and a retina-like component that absorbs light. The two main components of the ocelloid are the hyalosome and the melanosome. The hyalosome is a translucent, layered cornea-like structure that is bounded at the base by iris-like constriction rings. Like other non-plastid organelles, the hyalosome is thought to be synthesized by the cell and disassembled during cell division, then reassembled in each daughter cell. The hyalosome appears to form a continuous network with mitochondria in the nearby cytoplasm, which is why the hyalosome is believed to be a derived mitochondrion. The melanosome, also called the retinal body, is derived from photosynthetic plastids originating in red algae. The melanosome is a highly organized and pigmented compartment that is separated by the hyalosome by a seawater chamber. Thylakoids emerge when it becomes relatively unordered during cell division, which provides support for the plastid origin of the melanosome. Structural details of the ocelloid, such as the number and morphology of hyalosome constriction rings can be used to distinguish different species of Warnowia. Although the morphological details of the ocelloid can be useful for some species differentiation, the structure and position of the ocelloid are malleable throughout the life cycle of Warnowia and so these characteristics are not concrete enough to be considered taxonomic criteria for delimiting species and genera.

=== Life cycle ===
Heterotrophic protists such as Warnowia are particularly difficult to culture because culturing a heterotroph necessitates knowing its prey and culturing it consecutively. Due to its advertence to being cultured, the life stages of Warnowia have not yet been documented. There is speculation that some species of Warnowia form cysts prior to cell division because dormant Warnowia cysts have been found in the fossil record. In addition, since the ocelloid re-organizes itself during cell division, it is thought that different life stages of Warnowia species have been previously mis-identified as unique species in a different genus. This has been remedied to some degree, with the assimilation of the genus Protopsis into Warnowia, although it is possible that some life-stages of Warnowia remain mis-identified.

=== Genetics and phylogeny ===
The genus Warnowia, along with Erythropsidinium, Pheopolykrikos, and Nematodinium, is part of the family Warnowiaceae, which is the group known as the warnowiids. The warnowiids are characterized by their highly complex organelles, particularly the light-sensitive ocelloid. This group forms a well-supported clade within the order Gymnodiniales sensu stricto, however the taxonomy within the warnowiids is poorly understood and highly problematic since these species are very difficult to culture and rare in the wild. When using SSU data it was found that the genus most closely related to Warnowia was Erythropsinium. The two form a monophyletic group that is sister to the Polykrikos clade within the Gymnodiniales. There is little known about the molecular phylogeny and relationships between species within the genus Warnowia.

=== Fossil history ===
In 2001, off the coast of Norway and Portugal, surface sediment samples were found to contain cysts that were identified as Warnowia rosea once germinated. The cysts were morphologically similar to acritarchs, which are organic microfossils that predate the presence of identifiable dinoflagellate cysts in the geological record. Acritarchs are present in the geological record dating back to 1.8 million years ago, from all time periods from the Proterozoic eon to the present. The presence of identifiable Warnowia cysts and their morphological similarity to acritarchs supports the idea that athecate dinoflagellates may be represented by acritarchs in the ancient fossil record.

== List of species ==
The following species are recognized in this genus:

- Warnowia alba (Kofoid & Swezy) Lindemann C
- Warnowia atra (Kofoid & Swezy) J.Schiller C
- Warnowia compacta (F.Schütt) J.Schiller C
- Warnowia dohrnii W.Zimmermann C
- Warnowia fusus (Schütt) Lindemann C
- Warnowia hataii (Kofoid) J.Schiller C
- Warnowia juno (F.Schütt) J.Schiller C
- Warnowia maculata (Kofoid & Swezy) Lindemann C
- Warnowia maxima (Kofoid & Swezy) Lindemann C
- Warnowia mutsui (Kofoid) J.Schiller C
- Warnowia panamensis (Kofoid) J.Schiller C
- Warnowia parva (Lohmann) Er.Lindemann C
- Warnowia polyphemus (Pouchet) J.Schiller C
- Warnowia pouchetii (Kofoid & Swezy) J.Schiller C
- Warnowia pulchra (J.Schiller) J.Schiller C
- Warnowia purpurata (Kofoid & Swezy) Er.Lindemann C
- Warnowia purpurescens (Kofoid & Swezy) Er.Lindemann C
- Warnowia reticulata (Kofoid) J.Schiller C
- Warnowia rosea (Pouchet) J.Schiller C
- Warnowia rubescens (Kofoid & Swezy) Er.Lindemann C
- Warnowia schuettii (Kofoid & Swezy) J.Schiller C
- Warnowia striata (Kofoid & Swezy) J.Schiller C
- Warnowia subnigra (Kofoid & Swezy) J.Schiller C
- Warnowia violescens (Kofoid & Swezy) Er.Lindemann C
- Warnowia voracis (Kofoid & Swezy) J.Schiller C
