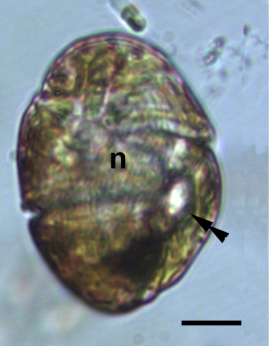
- Light micrograph of a Nematodinium with a double arrow pointing to the ocelloid

Scientific classification
- Domain: Eukaryota
- Supergroup: Alveolata
- Division: Dinoflagellata
- Class: Dinophyceae
- Order: Gymnodiniales
- Family: Warnowiaceae
- Genus: Nematodinium; Kofoid & Swezy, 1921

Type species
- Nematodinium partitum Kofoid & Swezy, 1921

= Nematodinium =

Genus of single-celled organisms

Nematodinium is a genus of athecate marine dinoflagellates. Roughly ovoid in shape, their defining characteristic is the presence of nematocysts, from which their name is derived. They are part of the Warnowiacaea family that are famous for the ocelloid, an eye-like organelle that responds to light.

== Etymology ==
The name of the genus comes from Charles A. Kofoid and Olive Swezy (1921) to describe the characteristic feature of the genus: the presence of nematocysts, small explosive extrusome organelles that are similar to mucocysts in size and shape.

== Type species ==
The type species of Nematodinium is Nematodinium partitum.

Kofoid and Swezy first described the genus Nematodinium in 1921. They described two novel species of Nematodinium: N. partitum, N. torpedo, as well as N. armatum which had first been observed by Dogiel in 1906.

== Habitat ==
Nematodinium are very rare and fragile, making them challenging both to culture and to study as they will change morphologies or die under light microscopy. Therefore, most of the information regarding their morphology is determined directly from field samples. They have been caught and seen along the eastern and western coasts of North America, the western coast of the United Kingdom, and the waters of Denmark. They are found exclusively in marine environments and are seen more abundantly in higher temperatures, such as within the range of 20–27 °C (68–81 °F). They have yet to be observed feeding, but cells collected from the ocean contained food vacuoles with trichocysts, which are found in dinoflagellates, suggesting Nematodinium eat dinoflagellates. Nematodinium species can be either photosynthetic or non-photosynthetic. Nematodinium armatum, and Nematodinium parvum are photosynthetic, while the other species are not. However, this is controversial due to the complexity of differentiating between different species, with some claiming that Nematodinium parvum is the only photosynthetic Nematodinium species.

== Description ==
=== Morphology ===
The size of the organism depends on the species but ranges from 30 μm to 100 μm in length. Their width ranges between 25 and 70 μm.

=== Characteristic organelles ===
Going around the outside of Nematodinium cells is a cingulum, a belt-like structure that winds around 1.2-2.5 times, depending on the species.

The nucleus is large and found in the center of the cell, and in some species even reaches from apex to the bottom of the cell.

Not all species of Nemotodinium have a chloroplast. The chloroplasts in Nematodinium parvum are net-like and arranged as thin lobes that go around the perimeter of the cell.

==== Ocelloid ====
Nemotodinium has an eyespot made of a lens and pigment cup with a light sensitive retinoid, now known as the ocelloid. The refractive index of the lens was measured and it was found that the retinoid focuses the light coming in from outside of the cell. When the first Warnowiid was described, the researchers had assumed the cell had grabbed the eye from a decaying jellyfish. The ocelloid is reminiscent of multicellular camera eyes as have developed in vertebrates. They consist of a melanosome, which is similar to a retinal body, made from plastids that contain peridinin, a carotenoid compound, likely acquired from the endosymbiosis of red algae. The melanosome is connected to a hyalosome, a translucent cornea-like and lens-like structure built from mitochondria. Under 505 nm (green) light, the retinal body fluoresces red, indicating the presence of chlorophyll. Additionally, the cornea-like layer of the ocelloid was composed of mitochondria. The melanosome disassembles when the cell is dividing, whereas the hyalosome is remade after the daughter cells split.

==== Nematocyst ====
Most Nemotodinium have their hallmark nematocysts, small ballistic extrusomes used for predation. The Nematodidium nematocyst contains a ring of subcapsules in concentric rings. The mechanism of their eruption is still uncertain, but it has been observed that there is a release of a membrane with a lattice structure potentially due to pressure created by capsule walls.

==== Ocelloid, melanosome, and hyalosome division during asexual division ====
First, the melanosome divides into two portions and the hyalosome breaks down. During the formation of the two daughter cells but before their separation, the melanosome sections separate, with one part moving to the antapex and the other remaining in the original position of the non-dividing cell. Lastly, just before cytokinesis, the hyalosome, melanosome, and ocelloid had grown to the size that would be seen in single cells. Each daughter cell contains a newly formed ocelloid. Sexual stages have not been observed.

== Practical importance ==
Nematodinium, like other Warnowiaceaea, are relevant because of their ocelloids which are of interest for studying the development and evolution of specialized organelles that can focus light and might lead to information regarding the evolution of eyes. As protists, they are important for studies on other single-celled organisms.

== List of species ==
There are six species recognized in this genus:

- Nematodinium armatum (Dogiel) Kofoid & Swezy, 1921
- Nematodinium atromaculatum Kofoid, 1931
- Nematodinium lebourae (Kofoid & Swezy) Schiller
- Nematodinium partitum Kofoid & Swezy, 1921
- Nematodinium parvum (Lohmann) Moestrup, 2023
- Nematodinium torpedo Kofoid & Swezy, 1921
