= Intercellular communication =

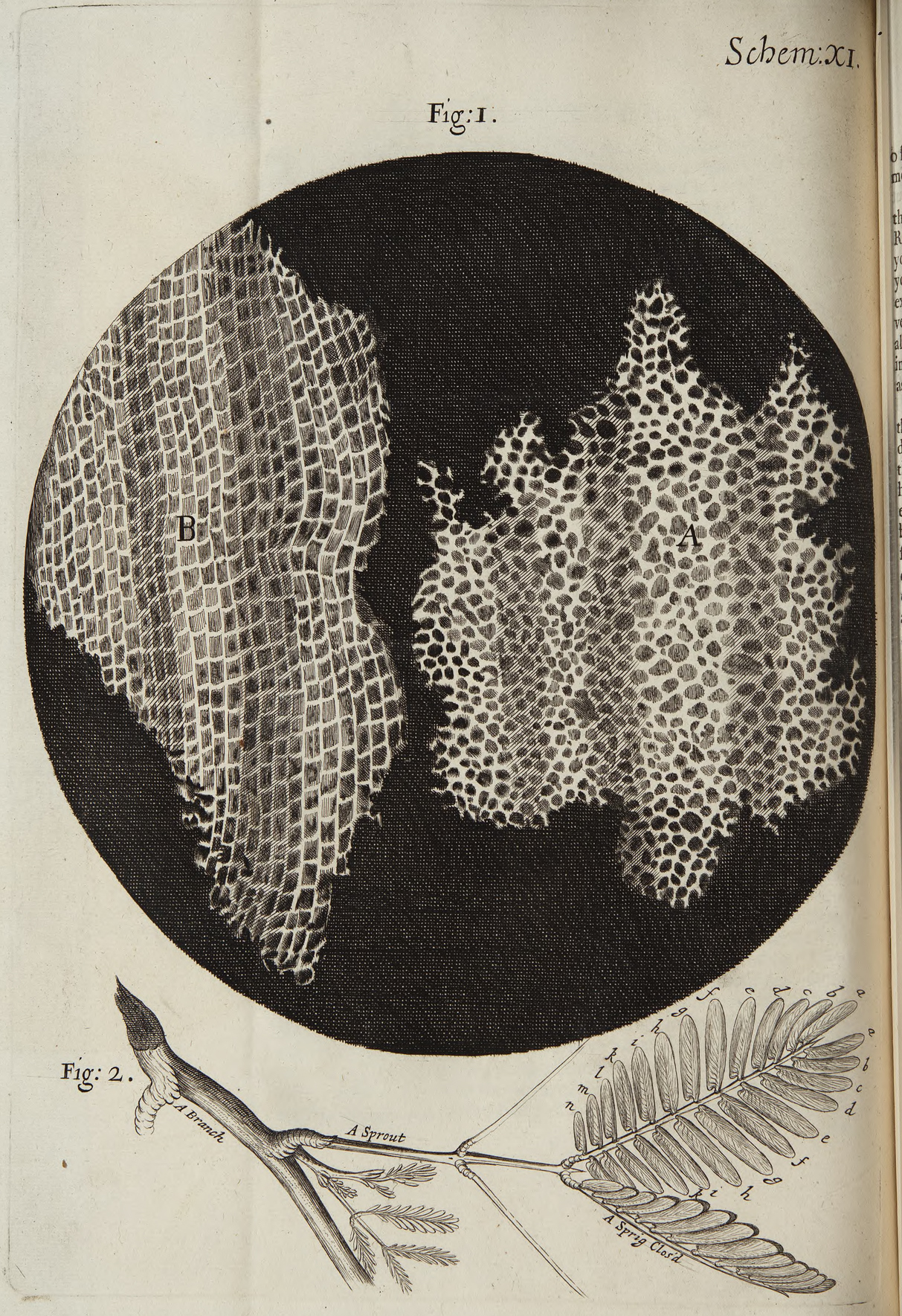
Micrographia cells in 1665. But I couldn't find with my microscope, breath or any other way I have tried, a passage out of one cell into another, yet I cannot conclude, that there aren't any passages that exist that the plant juices must pass through.

Intercellular communication (ICC) refers to the various ways and structures that biological cells use to communicate with each other directly or through their environment. Often the environment has been thought of as the extracellular spaces within an animal. More broadly, cells may also communicate with other animals, either of their own group or species, or other species in the wider ecosystem. Different types of cells use different proteins and mechanisms to communicate with one another using extracellular signalling molecules or electric fluctuations which could be likened to an intercellular Ethernet. Components of each type of intercellular communication may be involved in more than one type of communication, making attempts at clearly separating the types of communication listed somewhat futile. Broadly speaking, intercellular communication may be categorized as being within a single animal or between an animal and other animals in the ecosystem in which it lives. In this article, intercellular communication has been further collated into various areas of research rather than by functional or structural characteristics.

== Communication within an organism ==
=== Cell signalling ===
==== Molecular cell signaling ====
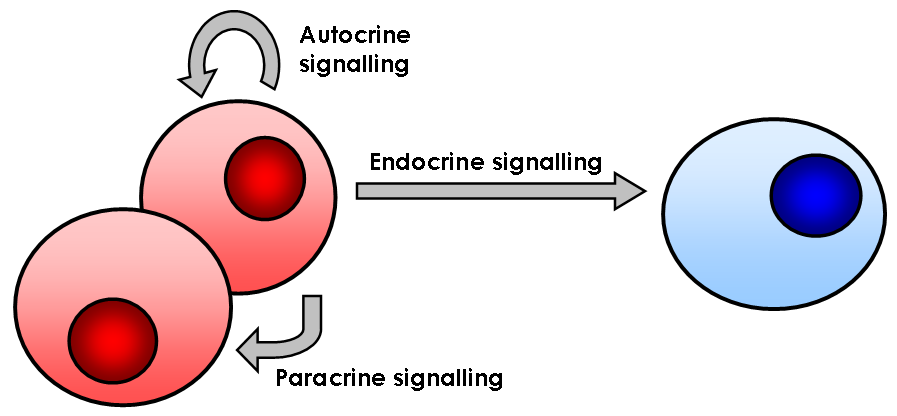
Cell signalling

Single-celled organisms sense their environment to seek food and may send signals to other cells to behave symbiotically or reproduce. A classic example of this is the slime mold. The slime mold shows how intercellular communication with a small molecule (e.g., cyclic AMP) allows a simple organism to form from an organized aggregation of single cells. Research into cell signalling investigated a receptor specific to each signal or multiple receptors potentially being activated by a single signal. It is not only the presence or absence of a signal that is important but also the strength. Using a chemical gradient to coordinate cell growth and differentiation continues to be important as multicellular animals and plants become more complex. This type of intercellular communication within an organism is commonly referred to as cell signalling. This type of intercellular communication is typified by a small signalling molecule diffusing through the spaces around cells, often relying on a diffusion gradient forming part of the signalling response.

==== Cell junctions ====
4 types of cell junction simplified

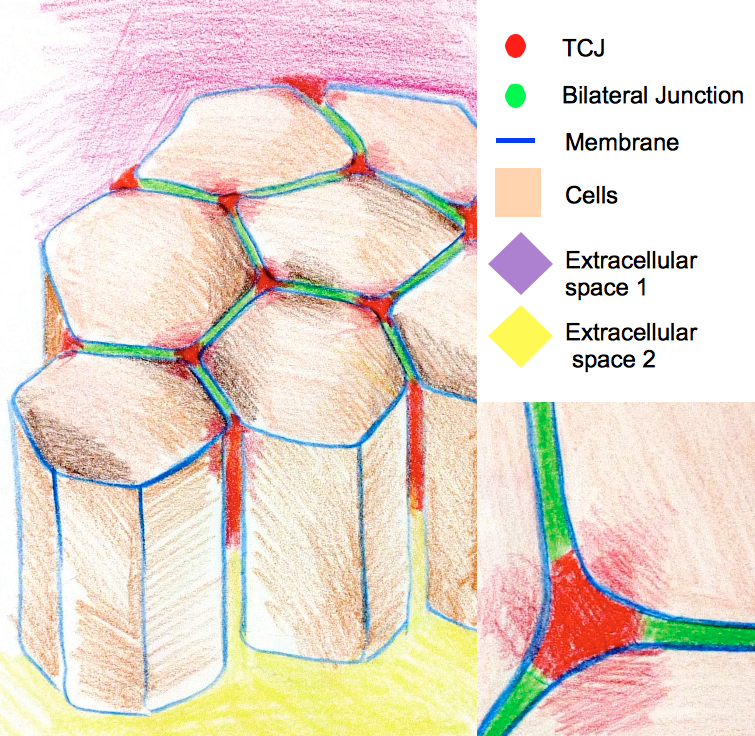
Epithelium TCJ

Complex organisms may have molecules to hold the cells together which can also be involved in intercellular communication. Some binding molecules are termed the extracellular matrix and may involve longer molecules like cellulose for the cell wall in plants or collagen in animals. When the membranes of two animal cells are close, they may form special types of cell junctions, which come in three broad types: occluding junctions (such as tight junctions and septate junctions), anchoring junctions (such as adherens junctions, desmosomes, focal adhesions, and hemidesmosomes), and communicating junctions (such as gap junctions). The structures they form also form parts of complex protein signaling pathways. In one respect, tight junctions play a generic role in cell signaling in that they may form a tight zip around cells, forming a barrier to stop even small, unwanted signalling molecules from getting between cells. Without these junctions, signalling molecules may spread to another group of cells which are not requiring the signal or escape too quickly from where they are needed. Gap junctions allow neighboring cells to directly exchange small molecules.

==== Pannexins, connexins, innexins ====
Cell pannexin tree

Pannexins, connexins, and innexins are transmembrane proteins that are all named after the Latin term nexus, meaning to connect. They are grouped as they all share a similar structure of 4 transmembrane domains crossing the cell membrane in a similar way, but they do not all share enough sequence homology to allow them to be considered directly related. Earlier investigations involving the connexins demonstrated cells forming a direct connection with each other using groups of connexins but not connections with the cell exterior. As such they were not considered to participate in the extracellular cell signalling at the time. Later studies made it apparent connexins could connect directly to the cell exterior meaning they are a conduit for the release an uptake of signalling molecules from the environment external to the cell. Furthermore, pannexins appear to do this to such an extent they may rarely if ever participate in direct cell to cell coupling. As indicated on the pannexin/innexin/connexin tree illustrated many animals do not appear to have pannexins/innexins/connexins, perhaps indicating there may be other similar proteins still to be discovered that serve to aid intercellular communication in these animals.

=== Direct links between cells ===
==== Septal pores ====
Fungal hypha

In fungi, pores crossing their cell walls that separate cellular compartments act as an ICC for the movement of molecules to their neighboring compartments.

Most red algae may have pores in the cell septum that partitions a cell/filament called a pit connection. As a leftover of the mitotic division it may be plugged up by the cell. There are also similar connections between neighboring cells/filaments that may allowing sharing of nutrients. Cells of a different species may initiate and form a pit connection with the host algae.

==== Plasmodesmata in plants ====
Plasmodesma allowing the symplast pathway

Plant cells usually have thick cell walls which need to be crossed if neighboring cells are to communicate directly. Plasmodesmata form a pipe through the cell wall forming an ICC. The pipe has another smaller membranous pipe concentric to it connecting the endoplasmic reticulum of the two cells via a tube called the desmotubule. The larger pipe also contains cytoskeletal and other elements. It is presumed viruses use plasmodesmata as a route through the cell walls to spread through the plant.

==== Gap junctions in animals ====
Gap junctions can form intercellular links, effectively a tiny direct regulated "pipe" called a connexon pair between the cytoplasms of the two cells that form the junction. 6 connexins make a connexon, 2 connexons make a connexon pair so 12 connexin proteins build each tiny ICC. This ICC allows two cells to communicate directly while being sealed from the outside world. Cells may form one or thousands of these tiny ICCs between them and their other neighbors, potentially forming large networks of directly linked cells. The connexon pairs form ICCs that can transport water, many other molecules up to around 1000 atoms in size and can be very rapidly signaled to turn on and off as required. These ICCs are also communicating electrical signals that can be rapidly turned on and off. To add to their versatility there are a range of these ICC types due to their being over 20 different connexins with different properties that can combine with each other in a variety of ways. The variety of potential signaling combinations that results is enormous. A much studied example of gap junctions electrical signalling abilities is in the electrical synapses found on nerves. In heart muscle gap junctions function to coordinate the beating of the heart. Adding even further to their versatility gap junctions can also function to form a direct connection to the exterior of a cell paralleling the functioning of the protein cousin the pannexins which are explained elsewhere.

==== Intercellular bridge ====
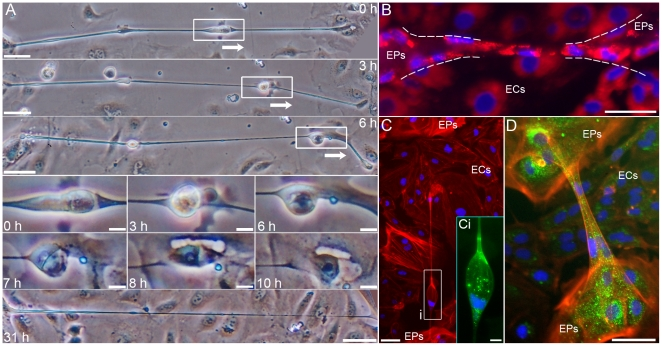
Tubular bridges for bronchial epithelial cell migration and communication

Intercellular bridges are larger than gap junction ICCs so are able to allow the movement of not only small signaling molecules but also large DNA molecules or even whole cell organelles. They are maintained between two cells allowing them to exchange cytoplasmic contents and are frequently observed when cells need intimate communication such as when they are reproducing. They are found in Prokaryotes for exchanging DNA, small organisms such as Pinnularia, Valonia ventricosa, Volvox, C. elegans and mitosis generally (Cytokinesis), Blepharisma for sexual reproduction and during Meiosis including Spermatocytogenesis to synchronise development of germ cells and oogenesis in larger organisms. Bridges have shown to assist in cell migration as shown in the adjacent picture. Cytoplasmic bridges can also be used to attack another cell as in the case of Vampirococcus.

==== Cell fusion ====
Cells that require a more permanent, extensive cytoplasmic linkage may fuse with each other to varying degrees in many cases forming one large cell or syncytium. This happens extensively during the development of skeletal muscle forming large muscle fibers. Later it was confirmed in other tissues such as the eye lens. Though both involving cell fibers, in the case of the eye lens the cell fusion is more limited in scope resulting in a less extensively fused stratified syncytium.

=== Vesicles ===
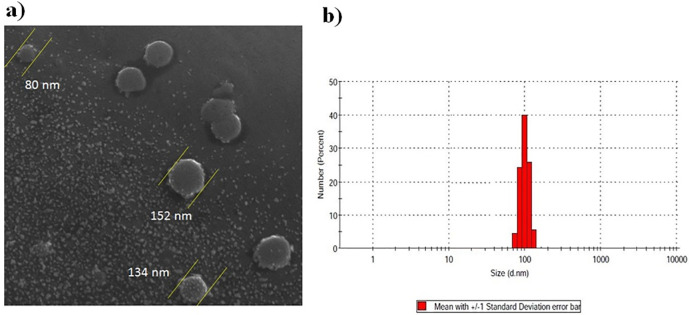
Pone.0265619.g001

Lipid membrane bound vesicles of a large range of sizes are found inside and outside of cells, containing a huge variety of things ranging from food to invading organisms, water to signaling molecules. Using an electrical nerve impulse from a neuron of a neuromuscular junction to stimulate a muscle to contract is an example of very small (about 0.05μm) vesicles being directly involved in regulating intercellular communication. The neuron produces thousands of tiny vesicles, each containing thousands of signalling molecules. One vesicle is released close to the muscle every second or so when resting. When activated by a nerve impulse more than 100 vesicles will be released at once, hundreds of thousands of signalling molecules, causing a significant contraction of the muscle fiber. All this happens in a small fraction of a second.

Generally small vesicles used to transport signalling molecules released from the cell are termed exosomes or simply extracellular vesicles (EV), and in addition to their importance to the organism they are also important for biosensors. Extracellular vesicles can be released from malignant cancer cells. These extracellular vesicles have been shown to contain gap junction proteins over-expressed in the malignant cells that spread to non-cancerous cells appearing to enhance the spread of the malignancy. Vesicles are also associated with the transport of materials outside of the cell to enable growth and repair of tissues in the extracellular matrix. In situations such as these they may be given special designations such as Matrix Vesicles (MV).

Examples of larger vesicles are in regulatory secretary pathways in endocrine, exocrine tissues, transcytosis and the vesiculo-vacuolar organelle (VVO) in endothelial and perhaps other cell types. Another form of transfer of pieces of membrane around junctions is called trans-endocytosis. Some large intercellular vesicles also appear to stay intact as they transport their contents from one part of a tissue to another and involve gap junction plaques.

=== Communication in nervous systems ===
Complete neuron cell diagram

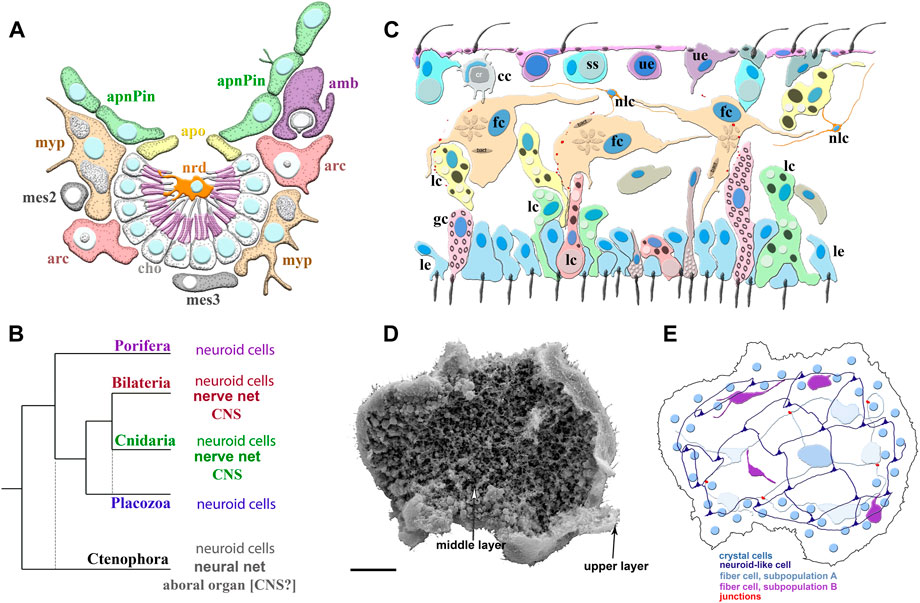
Nervous systems of sponges (porifera) and placozoans

When we think of intercellular communication we often use our nervous system as a point of reference. Nerves made up of many cells in vertebrates are typically highly specialized in form and function usually being the most complex in the brain. They ensure rapid precise, directional cell to cell communication over longer distances, for example from your brain to your hand. The nerve cells can be thought of as intermediary's, not so much communicating with each other but rather passing on the messages from one neighboring cell to another. Being "accessory" cells that pass on the message they require an additional space and can consume a lot of energy within an organism.

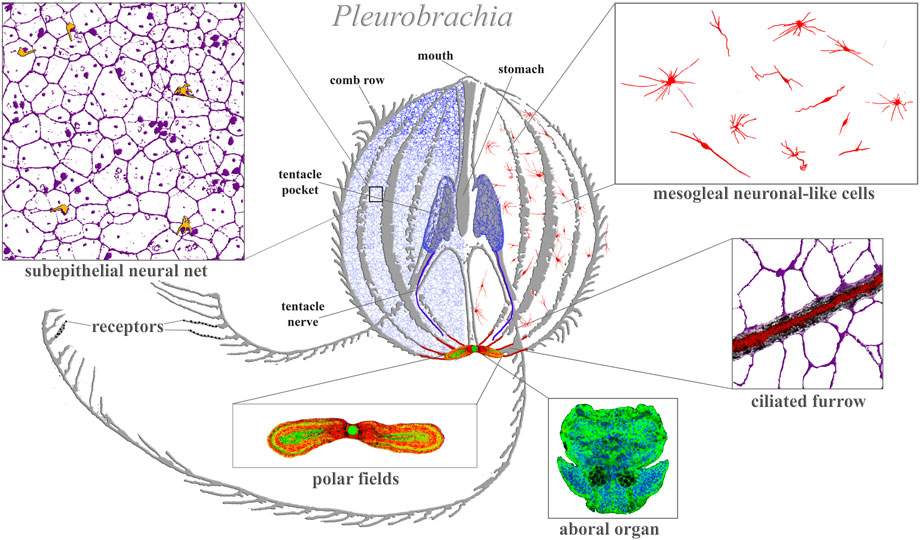
Ctenophore neural systems.

Simpler organisms such as sponges and placozoans often have less food availability and so less energy to spare. Their nervous systems are less specialized and the cells that are part of it are required to do other functions as well.

==== Ephaptic coupling ====
When groups of nerve cells form another type of intercellular communication called ephaptic coupling can arise. It was first quantified by Katz in 1940 but it has been difficult to associate any one structure or "ephapse" with this form of communication. There are reductionist attempts to associate particular groups of nerve cells exhibiting ephaptic coupling with particular functions in the brain. As yet there are no studies on the simplest neural systems such as the polar bodies of Ctenophores to see if ephaptic coupling may explain some of their more complex behaviors.

== Ecosystem intercellular communication ==
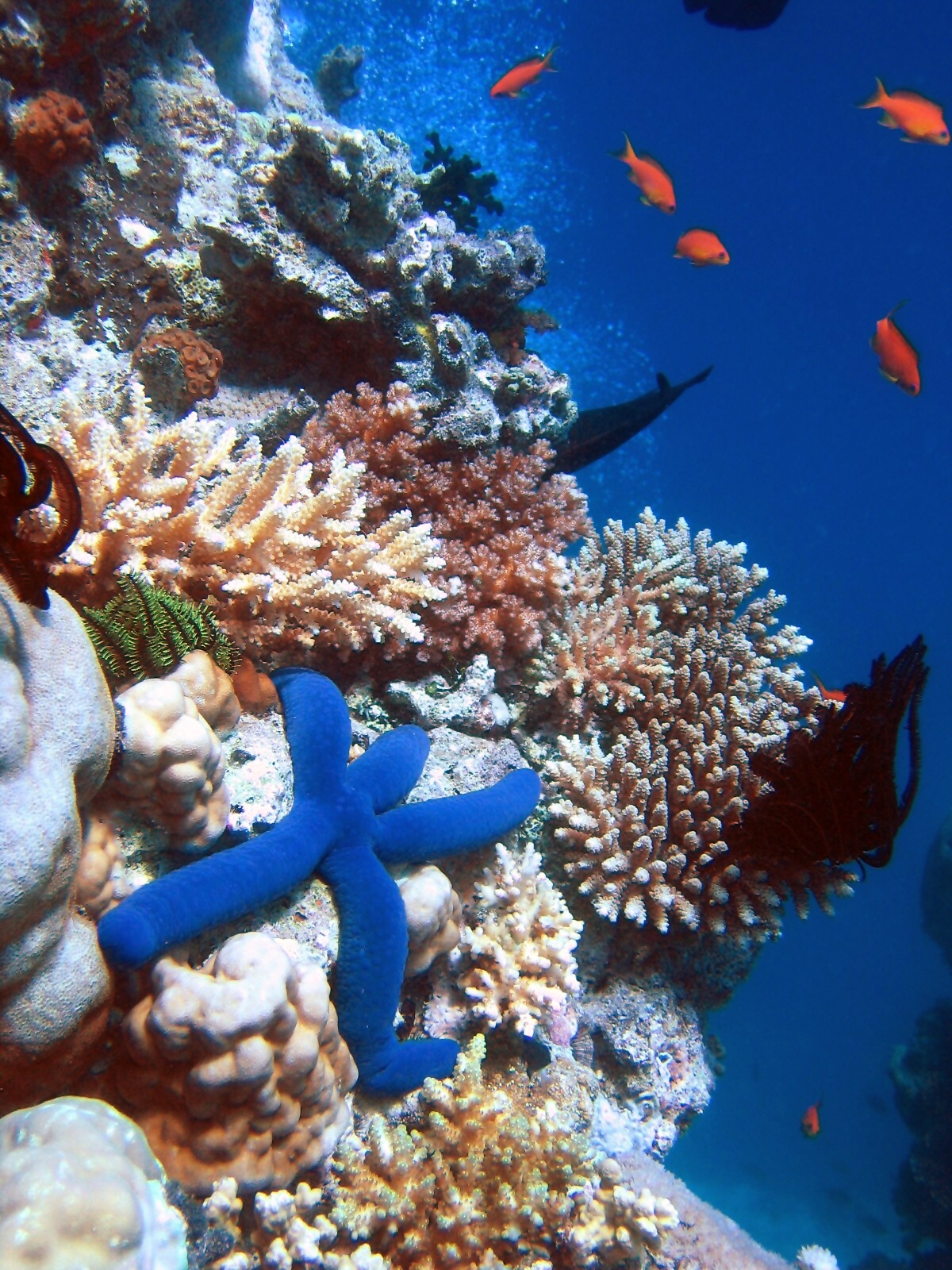
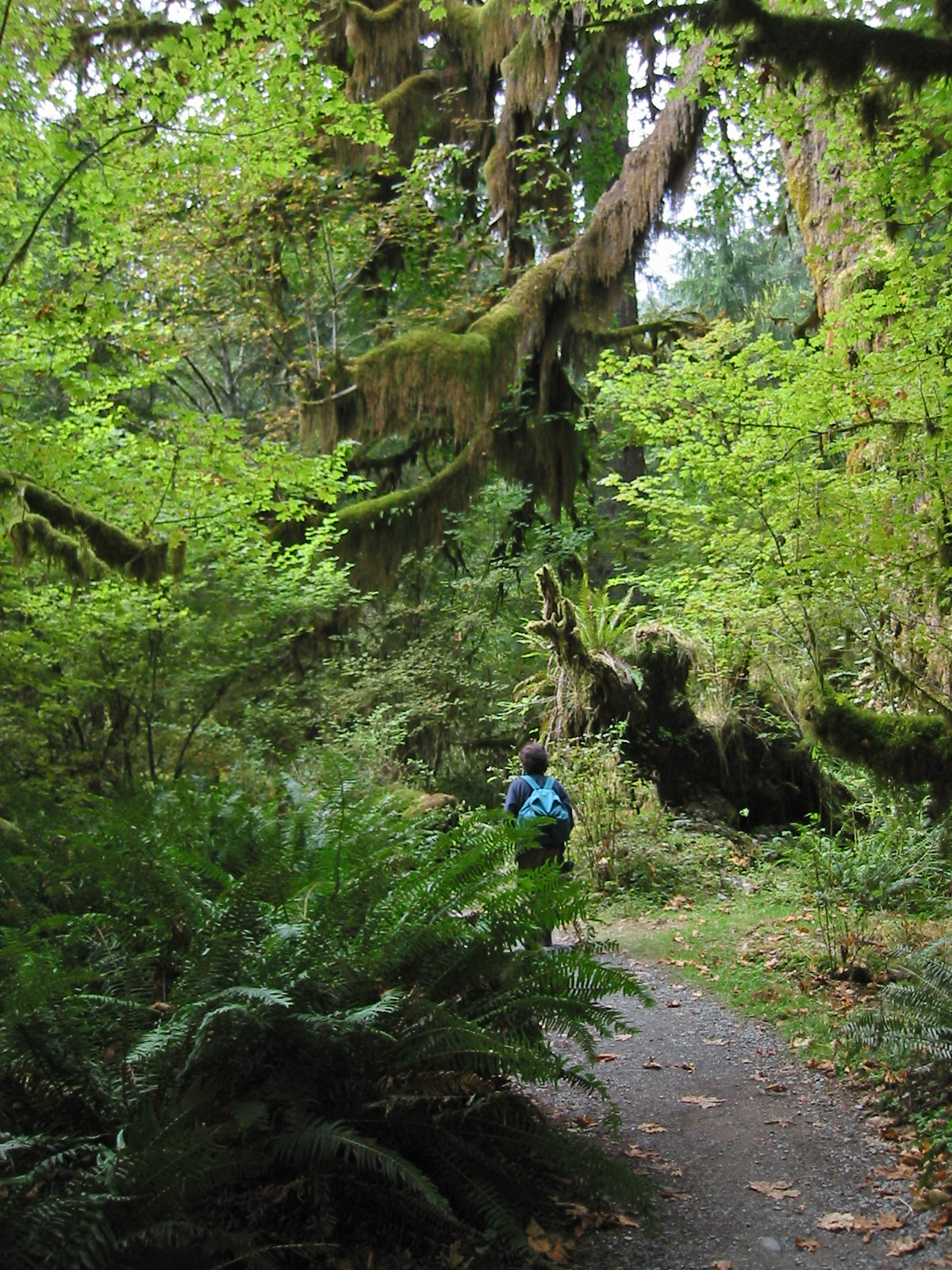
Left: Coral reef ecosystems undergo mass synchronized spawning Right: Temperate rainforest, a terrestrial ecosystem where plants and fungi communicate above and below ground over large distances.

The definition of biological communication is not simple. In the field of cell biology early research was at a cellular to organism level. How the individual cells in one organism could affect those in another was difficult to trace and not of primary concern. If intercellular communication includes one cell transmitting a signal to another to elicit a response, intercellular communication is not restricted to the cells within a single organism. Over short distances interkingdom communication in plants is reported. In-water reproduction often involves vast synchronized release of gametes called spawning. Over large distances cells in one plant will communicate with cells in another plant of the same species and other species by releasing signals into the air such as green leaf volatiles that can, among other things, pre-warn neighbors of herbivores or in the case of ethylene gas the signal triggers ripening in fruits. Intercellular signalling in plants can also happen below ground with the mycorrhizal network which can link large areas of plants via fungal networks allowing the redistribution of environmental resources.

Looking at insect colonies such as bees and ants we have discovered the pheromones released from one organism's cells to another organism's cells can coordinate colonies in a way reminiscent of slime molds. Cell to cell signalling using "pheromones" was also found in more complex animals. As complexity increases so does the effect of signals. "Pheromones" in more complex animals such as vertebrates are now more correctly referred to as "chemosignals" including between species.

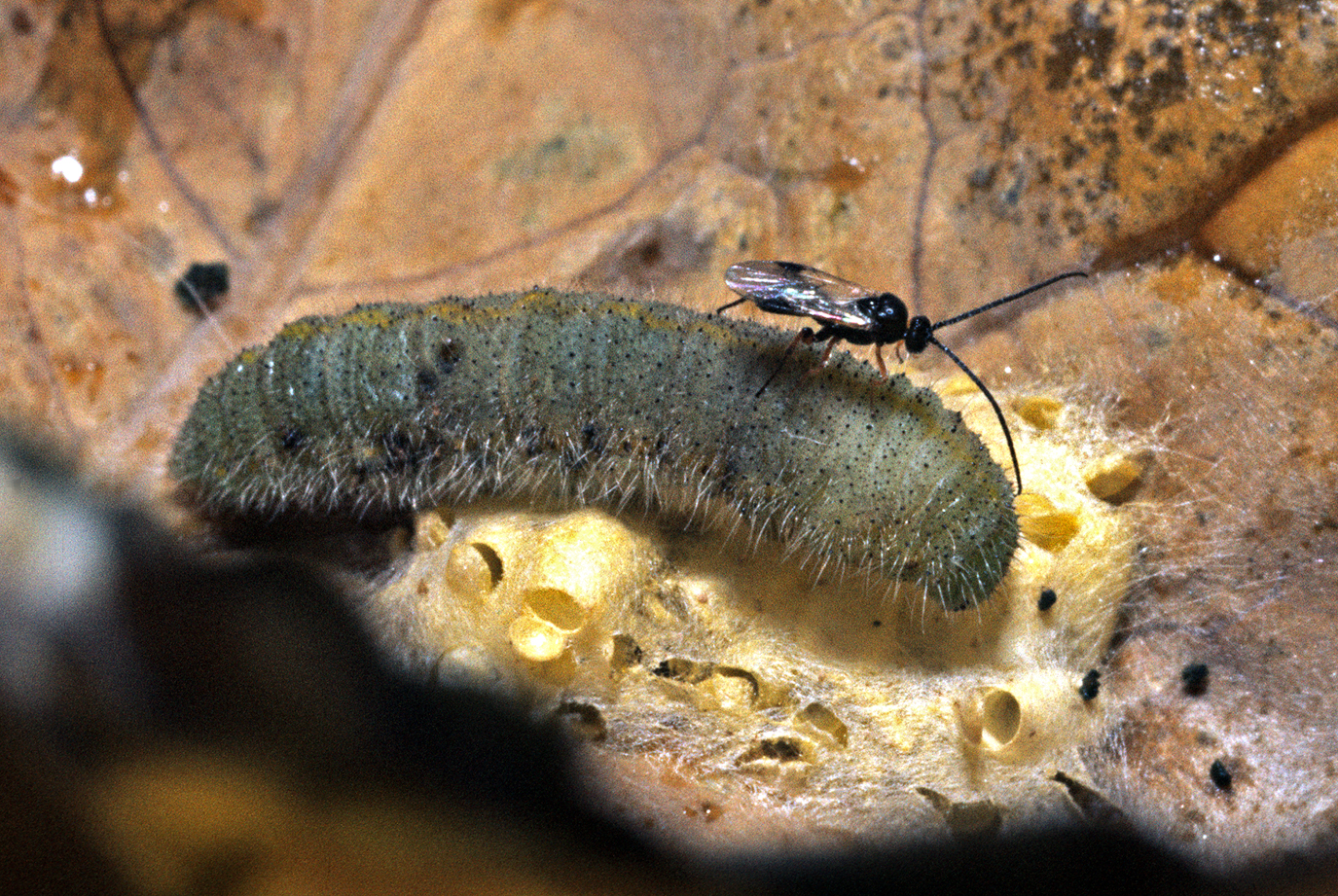
Paristatoid wasp on caterpillar

The idea that intercellular communication is so similar among cells within an organism as well as cells between different organisms, even prey, is demonstrated by vinnexin. This protein is a modified form of an innexin protein found in a caterpillar. That is, the vinnexin is very similar to the caterpillar's own innexin, and could only have been derived from a non-viral innexin in some way that is unclear. The caterpillar innexin forms normal intercellular connections inside the caterpillar as part of the caterpillar's immune response to an egg implanted by a parasitic wasp. The innexin helps ensure the wasp egg is neutralized, saving the caterpillar from the parasite. So what does the vinnexin do and how? Evolution has led to a virus that communicates with the wasp in a way that evades the wasps antiviral responses, allowing the virus to live and replicate in the wasps ovaries. When the wasp injects its egg into the caterpillar host many virus from the wasp's ovary are also injected. The virus particles do not replicate in the caterpillar cells but rather communicate with the caterpillars genetic machinery to produce vinnexin protein. The vinnexin protein incorporates itself into the caterpillar's cells altering the communication in the caterpillar so the caterpillar goes on living but with an altered immune response. Vinnexins are able to mix with normal innexins to alter communication within the caterpillar and probably do. The altered communication within the caterpillar prevents the caterpillar's defenses rejecting the wasps egg. As a result, the wasp egg hatches, consumes the caterpillar and the virus from the wasp larva's mother, and repeats the cycle. It can be seen the virus and wasp are essential to each other and communicate well with each other to allow the virus to live and replicate, but only in a non-destructive way inside the wasp ovary. The virus is injected into a caterpillar by the wasp, but the virus does not replicate in the caterpillar, the virus only communicates with the caterpillar to modify it in a non-lethal way. The wasp larvae will then slowly eat the caterpillar without being stopped while communicating with the virus again to ensure that the wasp has a place in its ovary for it to again replicate. Connexins/innexins/vinnexins, once thought to only participate in providing a path for signaling molecules or electrical signals have now been shown to act as a signaling molecule itself.
