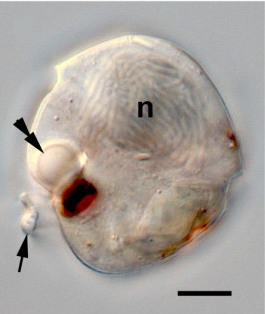
- A light micrograph of an ocelloid-containing dinoflagellate from the genus Proterythropsis. The nucleus is marked n, the ocelloid is indicated with a double arrowhead, and a posterior cell extension is indicated with an arrow; scale bar = 10 µm.

Scientific classification
- Domain: Eukaryota
- Supergroup: Alveolata
- Division: Dinoflagellata
- Class: Dinophyceae
- Order: Gymnodiniales
- Family: Warnowiaceae; Lindemann, 1928

Genera
- Erythropsidinium; Greuetodinium; Nematodinium; Nematopsides; Proterythropsis; Protopsis; Warnowia

= Warnowiaceae =

Family of single-celled organisms

The Warnowiaceae are a family of athecate dinoflagellates (a diverse group of unicellular eukaryotes). Members of the family are known as warnowiids. The family is best known for a light-sensitive subcellular structure known as the ocelloid, a highly complex arrangement of organelles with a structure directly analogous to the eyes of multicellular organisms. The ocelloid has been shown to be composed of multiple types of endosymbionts, namely mitochondria and at least one type of plastid.

== Habitat and life cycle ==
Warnowiids are found in marine plankton but are very rare in most plankton samples. Little is known about their life histories because they cannot be cultured in the laboratory, and samples obtained from the natural environment do not survive well under laboratory conditions. Studies of wild samples have found evidence of distinctive structures called trichocysts in warnowiid cell vacuoles, suggesting that their prey might be other dinoflagellates. Despite the complexity of the ocelloid, the experimental difficulty of working with the cells has prevented experimental study of light-directed behavior such as phototaxis.

== Taxonomy ==
The family contains seven recognized genera. Descriptions of genera and species within the family have been complicated by complex morphological changes during the life cycle and in response to the environment, and the systematics of this group is not currently well defined.

== Subcellular structures ==
The warnowiids as a group possess unusually complex subcellular structures. The ocelloid light sensitive structure is recognized as a synapomorphic character of warnowiids.

Other complex subcellular structures, such as nematocysts, trichocysts, and pistons, are present in some (but not all) warnowiids and are shared with the polykrikoid dinoflagellates, the closest extant relatives as defined by molecular phylogenetics.

== Ocelloid function and origin ==
The ocelloid of warnowiids functions similarly to eyes found in much larger organisms, containing structures similar to a retina and lens. It is receptive only to the polarized light that is created as light passes through the thecal plates of other dinoflagellates. Because dinoflagellates are the main source of food for warnowiids, this trait is particularly useful for locating prey.

The ocelloid is formed by structures of pre-existing organelles. Mitochondria form an exterior layer analogous to a cornea, while the retinal body is formed by a network of peridinin-type plastids that express light-sensitive rhodopsins and photosynthetic genes, though only some genera have photosynthetic capabilities. Although dinoflagellate plastids originated through an endosymbiosis with red algae, rhodopsins expressed there are most closely related to bacterial rhodopsins. These observations suggest that the evolution of ocelloids emerged from a complex history of endosymbiosis and horizontal gene transfer involving both eukaryotes and prokaryotes.

== Gallery ==
Warnowiids
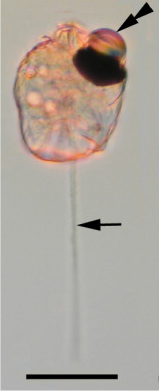
An isolate of Erythropsidinium. Scale bar 20 µm.

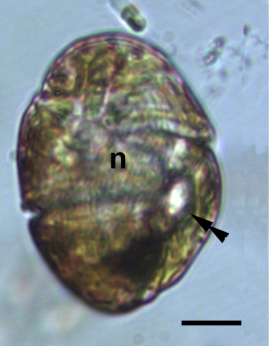
An isolate of Nematodinium. Scale bar 10 µm.

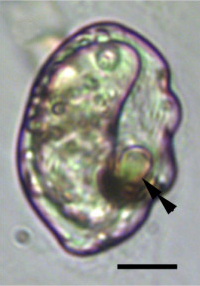
An isolate of Warnowia. Scale bar 10 µm.
Double arrows indicate the ocelloid, single arrow indicates the piston, n indicates the nucleus.
