= Piston (disambiguation) =

A piston is an engineering component of engines and pumps.

Piston(s) may also refer to:

== Science and technology ==
- Misnomer for a hydraulic cylinder
- Piston (optics)
- Piston (subcellular structure)
- Piston valve
- Fire piston, an ancient device for kindling fire
- Gas-operated reloading, sometimes referred to as a gas piston.
- Piston, the working name for the Steam Machines gaming platform

== People and groups ==
- Pist.On, an American heavy metal band
- Detroit Pistons, an American basketball team
- Steinbach Pistons, a Canadian ice hockey team
- Walter Piston, an American composer
- PISTON (transport group), a national federation of public transport associations in the Philippines

== Other ==
- Piston (music), a type of oboe
- Piston controls the combination action on a pipe organ
