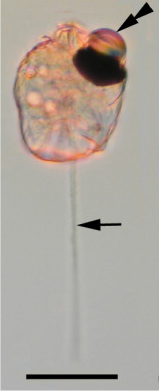
- An isolate of Erythropsidinium. The arrow indicates the piston; the double arrowhead indicates the ocelloid. Scale bar 20 μm.

Scientific classification
- Domain: Eukaryota
- Clade: Diaphoretickes
- Clade: SAR
- Clade: Alveolata
- Phylum: Myzozoa
- Superclass: Dinoflagellata
- Class: Dinophyceae
- Order: Gymnodiniales
- Family: Warnowiaceae
- Genus: Erythropsidinium; P.C. Silva

Species
- Erythropsidinium agile; Erythropsidinium cochlea; Erythropsidinium extrudens; Erythropsidinium minus

= Erythropsidinium =

Genus of single-celled organisms

Erythropsidinium (formerly Erythropsis) is a genus of dinoflagellates (a type of unicellular eukaryote) of the family Warnowiaceae.

== Characteristics ==
Erythropsidinium cells are a relatively large by dinoflagellate standards (50-120μm in longest dimension) and possess two flagella and two unusual organelles, the ocelloid and the piston. The ocelloid is light-responsive structure organized similarly to a multicellular organism's eye, considered a synapomorphic character for the Warnowiaceae; cells typically contain one ocelloid but occasional examples have been reported of cells containing two, without other indications of ongoing cell division. The piston is a long contractile structure protruding from the cell body, which is highly variable in length and morphology, and may contain prominent nodules along its length. As with the ocelloid, most cells possess a single piston, but in some cases specimens have been observed with two pistons on the same cell. The piston is capable of repetitive and dramatic contractile motion; its function is not clear, but roles in locomotion, prey capture, and defense have been suggested.

== Habitat ==
Erythropsidinium occurs in marine plankton and is found in warm or tropical waters, reported in all oceans and in the Mediterranean Sea. Studies conducted in the Pacific Ocean found that Erythropsidinium cells were most abundant in warm waters near the transition from the Kuroshio Current to slope waters near south Japan, where prey for these heterotrophic organisms is relatively abundant. The organism was not recorded in the colder waters of the Oyashio Current, sampled near Hokkaido. In this study, the species was most commonly found above the deep chlorophyll maximum, where prey would be expected to be at highest density; this observation may indicate that Erythropsidium species favor greater illumination, perhaps to make best use of the light-sensitive ocelloid.

== Taxonomy ==
The genus was originally described under the name Erythropsis by Richard Hertwig in 1885 based on samples from the Gulf of Naples. Although a number of species have been reported, these descriptions likely reflected newly divided cells; currently four species are recognized in the genus. The type species is Erythropsidinium agile.
