= Piston (subcellular structure) =

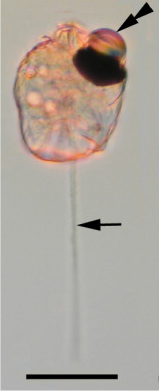
An isolate of Erythropsidinium. The arrow indicates the piston; the double arrowhead indicates the ocelloid. Scale bar 20 μm.

A piston (also known as a dart, prod, or tentacle) is a complex contractile organelle found in some dinoflagellates, namely the Erythropsidinium and Greuetodinium genera of the family Warnowiaceae. This group is also well known for possessing other unusually complex subcellular structures such as the ocelloid and nematocyst. Observations of Erythropsidinium samples reveal that the length of the piston is highly variable across specimens. The piston is known to be capable of repetitive and dramatic contractile motion; although its function is unknown, roles in locomotion, prey capture, and defense have been suggested.
