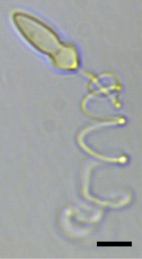
- A light micrograph of Polykrikos kofoidii showing an extruded nematocyst. Scale bar = 10µm.

Scientific classification
- Domain: Eukaryota
- Clade: Sar
- Clade: Alveolata
- Division: Dinoflagellata
- Class: Dinophyceae
- Order: Gymnodiniales
- Family: Polykrikaceae; Kofoid & Swezy, 1921

Genera
- Pheopolykrikos; Polykrikos

= Polykrikaceae =

Family of single-celled organisms

The Polykrikaceae (also known as Polykrikidae) are a family of athecate dinoflagellates of the order Gymnodiniales. Members of the family are known as polykrikoids. The family contains two genera: Polykrikos and Pheopolykrikos.

== Characteristics ==
The most distinctive feature of polykrikoids is their formation of multinucleate "pseudocolonies" consisting of an even number of subunit zooids. The two genera differ in number of nuclei; possessing two nuclei regardless of the number of zooids is a synapomorphy for Polykrikos, whereas Pheopolykrikos possess equal numbers of nuclei and zooids.

Along with the Warnowiaceae (warnowiids), polykrikoids are known for possessing unusually complex subcellular structures. In particular, an extrusome complex of two organelles called the nematocyst and taeniocyst is considered a synapomorphy for Polykrikos. Molecular phylogenetics studies suggest some inconsistency in the taxonomy of this group, particularly in the assignment of species to one of the two genera.

== Habitat and life cycle ==
Most polykrikoids are planktonic, although P. lebourae is benthic. The family includes photosynthetic, heterotrophic, and mixotrophic species. Some species, such as P. kofoidii, are of scientific interest due to their status as predators of other dinoflagellates, a behavior that is significant in the regulation of algal blooms. Others, such as Ph. hartmanii (which has been reclassified P. hartmanii) are themselves causes of ichthyotoxic algal blooms. P. hartmanii is capable of both heterothallic (outcrossing) and homothallic (self-fertilizing) sexual reproduction.

The reproductive behaviors of polykrikoids are mostly not well understood, although P. kofoidii has been studied and found to have a complex life cycle of both vegetative (asexual) and sexual reproduction complicated by its pseudocolonial structure.

== Evolution ==
The family demonstrates a complex evolutionary history indicating multiple instances of loss of photosynthetic plastids in different lineages. The distinctive pseudocolonial structure may have arisen in multiple evolutionary lineages from ancestors capable of forming chains of distinct individual cells.
