= TIGER domain =

== Background ==
The TIGER domain is a membraneless organelle in the cell which translates messenger RNA (mRNA) for membrane proteins in close association with the endoplasmic reticulum (ER). The TIGER domain contains two components: TIS granules (TIG) and the endoplasmic reticulum (ER). The function of this organelle has been linked to reducing inflammation in cells.

The TIGER domain was first documented by cell biologists Christine Mayr and Weirui Ma at the Gerstner Sloan Kettering Graduate School of Biomedical Sciences in 2018. The discovery of this cellular structure was significant because it revealed that ribosomes were not the only membraneless organelle that aided in protein synthesis in association with the ER.

=== Membraneless Organelles ===
Membraneless organelles are organelles that lack a lipid membrane and contribute to many biochemical reactions in the cell, such as gene regulation or protein folding. Despite their lack of an outer membrane, they still contain a definite morphology separating them from other components in the cytoplasm. These organelles are also known as biomolecular condensates, due to their structure typically appearing as droplet-like. They are usually organized in layers containing both proteins and nucleic acids, and the layers often contain different functions or properties. The formation of these condensates is a reversible process. Membraneless organelles are extremely small in size, and can become associated with membrane-bound organelles to aid in cellular functions.

The majority of membraneless organelles take on a spherical shape, except for a few exceptions, such as TIS granules, which tend to be filamentous in nature. Membraneless organelles can organize themselves through a process called phase separation, occurring between either a solid and liquid or liquid and liquid. Liquid-liquid phase separation (LLPS) is a common method of membraneless organelle formation, in which organelle components are suspended in a liquid medium separate from the liquid cytosol.

== Structural Components ==
=== TIS Granules ===
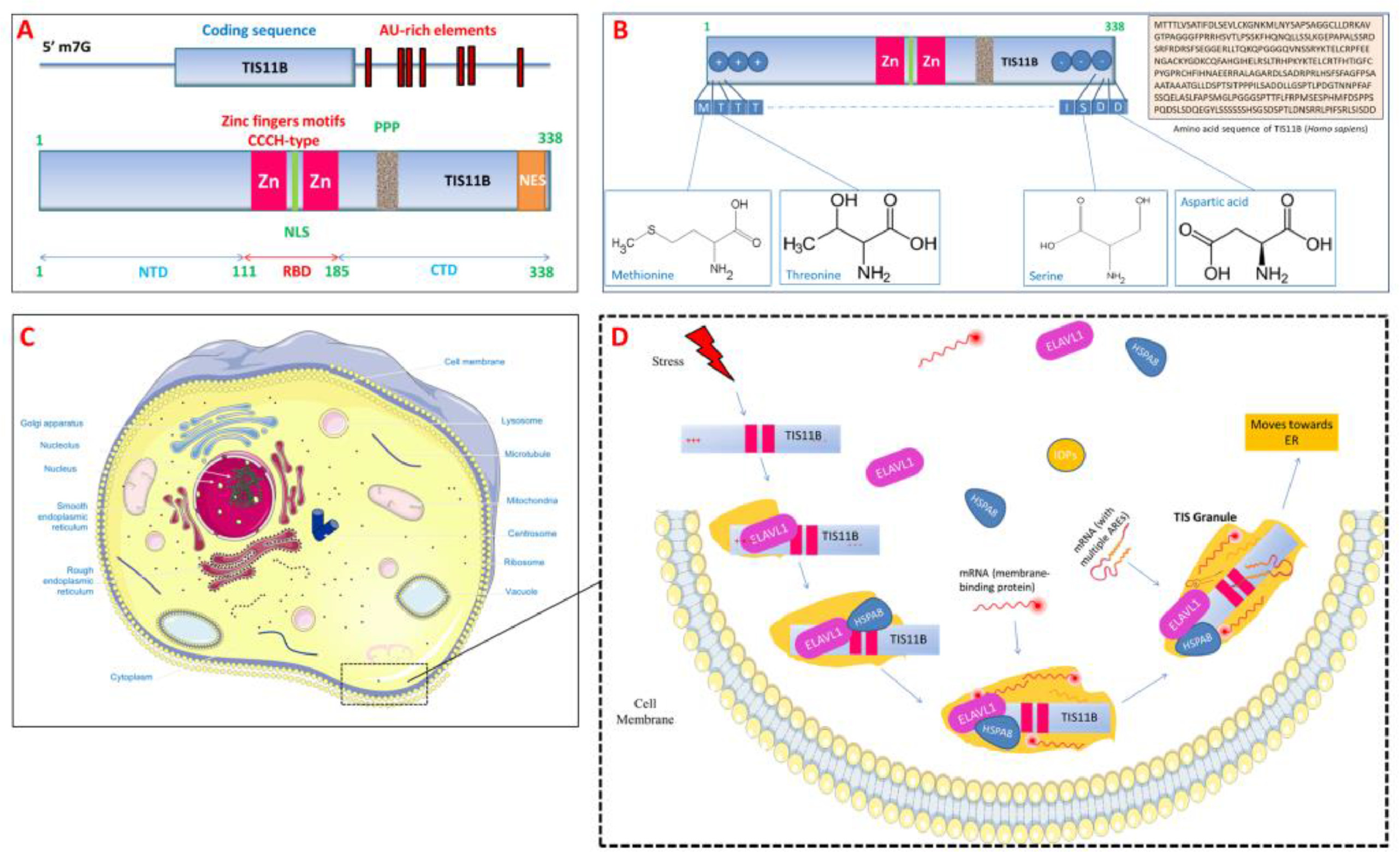
Diagram showing the process of formation of TIS granules in the cell. The diagram highlights the importance of the negatively and positively charged ends of the TIS11B protein in the TIS granule formation.

TIS granules are mostly composed of the RNA-binding protein TIS11B, which is a member of the tristetraprolin (TTP) family. Proteins in this family, also known as zinc finger proteins, primarily function to bind to mRNA, as well as destabilize and decay mRNA. In particular, TIS11B binds to adenine-uridine rich elements (AU-rich elements) on mRNA sequences and forms a condensate with a gel-like consistency. This binding stimulates the formation of the TIS granules, which become tightly associated with the surface of the rough endoplasmic reticulum. When several TIS granules are associated with the rough ER, this forms a mesh-like area known as the TIGER domain. TIS granules are also composed of other RNA-binding proteins, such as HuR, and certain chaperone proteins which aid in protein folding. TIS granules maintain their composition through liquid-liquid phase separation (LLPS). This separation allows the domain to remain biochemically unique from the cytoplasm to allow for organelle functions.

TIS granules are filamentous in nature due to their gel-like consistency and the large proportion of mRNA that maintains their structure. This structure allows for the TIS granules to become intertwined with the endoplasmic reticulum, creating a mesh-like area surrounding the rough ER known as the TIGER domain. Studies have found that this mesh-like appearance is likely caused by interactions between unstructured mRNA segments recruited by the TIS granules. In studies where these segments were disrupted and removed from the TIS granules, the TIGER domain did not assemble, and instead the TIS granules took on a spherical shape as opposed to their usual filamentous appearance. These filaments are essential in the TIS granules being able to intertwine and interact with the ER surface, and this filamentous appearance is partially what gave the TIGER domain its name, as the filaments resemble tiger stripes. Additionally, the mesh-like appearance of the domain is essential for its capabilities to aid in the translation and trafficking of membrane proteins to the plasma membrane.

TIS granules are stress granules, which form as a response to stress on the cell, such as conditions that might damage the cell or reduce the cell's chance of survival. The stress on the cell causes the TIS11B protein to gain a negative charge on its C-terminal and a positive charge on its N-terminal, and this polarization of the protein is essential for the formation of the TIS granule. The TIS granule then interacts with the rough ER to aid in reducing the stress on the cell by translation of 3' UTR mRNA sequences. TIS granule construction is a reversible process, and these granules will be disassembled once stress on the cell reduces.

TIS granules have been observed in most human cells, with the exception of cells that do not contain endoplasmic recticula, such as blood cells.

=== The Endoplasmic Reticulum ===
The endoplasmic reticulum (ER) functions to arrange and regulate protein and lipid synthesis inside the cell. The ER is primarily divided into two sections: the smooth ER and the rough ER. This designation depends on the presence or absence of ribosomes on the ER surface. The ER aids in both protein synthesis and modification depending on the final destination of the protein. Additionally, the ER functions to monitor the folding of proteins to their proper 3-dimensional structures. The ER can form associations with many membraneless organelles, such as ribosomes or TIS granules, and many of these associations play a role in reducing cell stress.

== Function ==
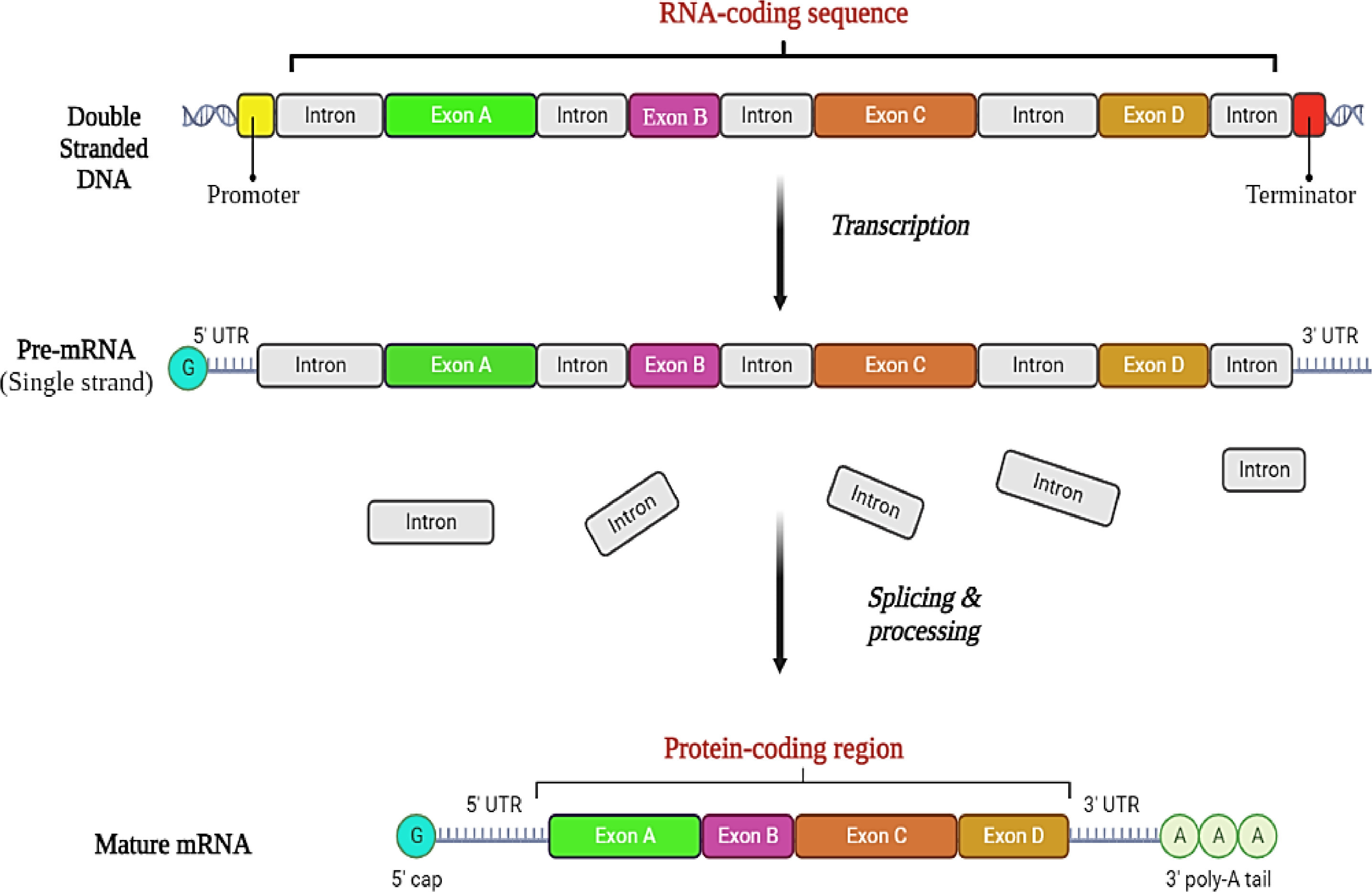
Diagram showing the process of RNA processing and splicing. The 3' UTR end is seen on the right end of the mRNA sequence.

The TIGER domain functions to aid in the translation of mRNA encoding for membrane proteins. The TIS granules become associated with the surface of the rough ER and translate the 3' untranslated regions (3' UTR) of AU-rich mRNA segments encoding for membrane proteins. The 3' UTR of an mRNA molecule is important in regulating the function and modifications of a protein after translation. Additionally, the length and AU-rich element richness of the 3' UTR can determine the final location of the protein in the cell and the stability of the mRNA. Many proteins are localized by the 3' UTR because they have no targeting sequences in their coding regions, however the majority of these proteins are membrane proteins.

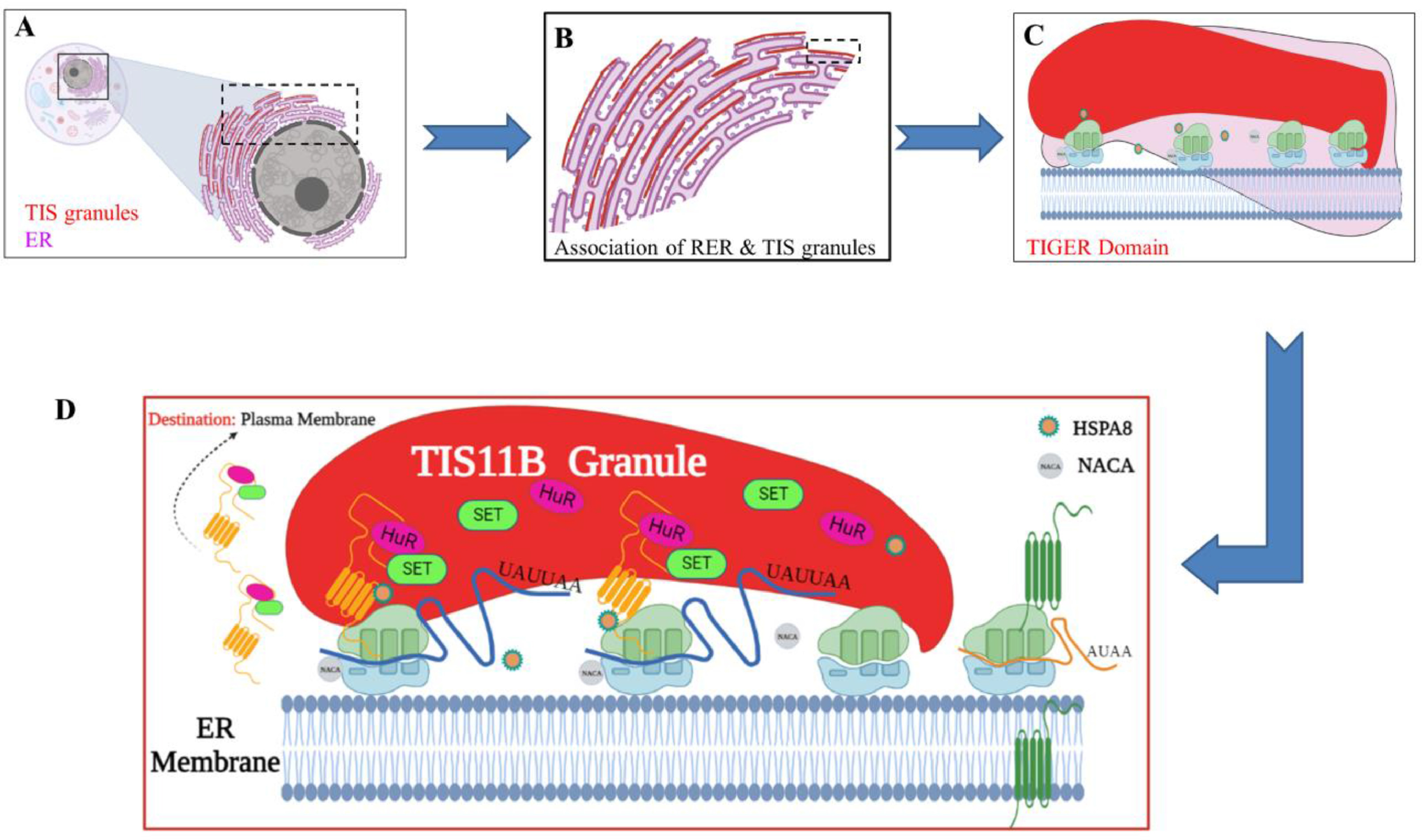
Diagram showing the structure and function of the TIGER domain. Specifically, the diagram highlights the association of the TIS granules to the endoplasmic reticulum and how this association aids in protein synthesis.

During translation, this information can be decoded by the TIS granules and used to facilitate protein-protein interactions (PPIs). It was found that TIS granules aid in forming these PPIs by bringing the 3' UTR of the mRNA and the translated protein into contact, which allows for these regions to facilitate these PPIs. This contact is initiated by the RNA-binding proteins of the TIS granules. Additionally, the biochemical environment of the TIGER domain is essential for forming these PPIs, as they cannot form in the cytosolic environment. It should also be noted, however, that some non-membrane proteins are also translated by the TIGER domain. This is largely due to these mRNA segments being opportunistic in their environment, and utilizing the domain for translation despite their final proteins having no need for the domain to function.

== Imaging ==
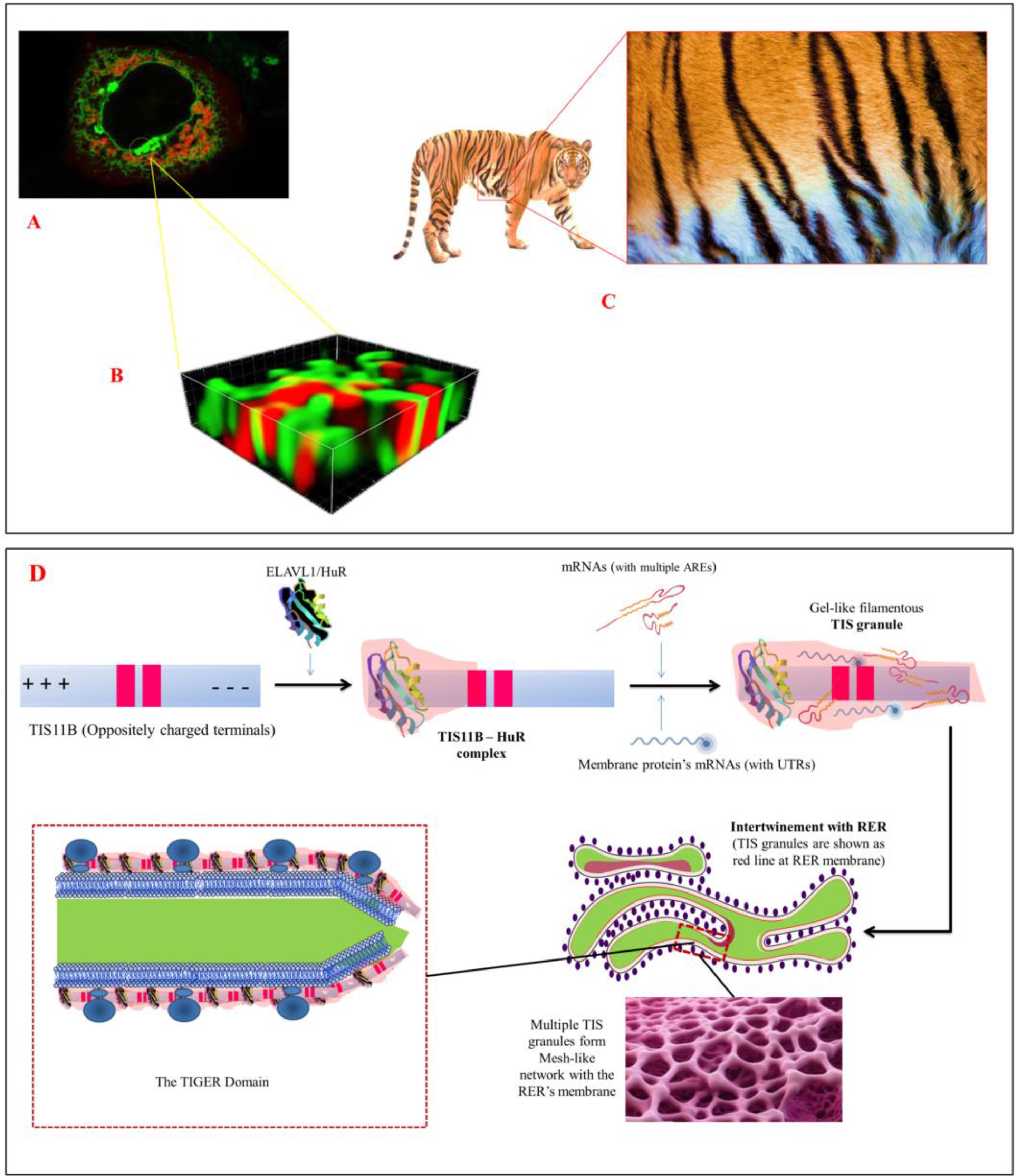
Fluorescence Recovery After Photobleaching (FRAP) image showing the structure of the TIGER domain. TIS granules are shown in red and the endoplasmic reticulum is shown in green. This image highlights the filamentous structure of the TIGER domain and how the filaments resemble tiger stripes.

Different microscopic imaging techniques, such as electron microscopy or fluorescence microscopy, have been utilized to capture images of membraneless organelles in the cell. In recent times, microscopic imaging of biomolecular condensates has been greatly improved by super-resolution microscopy technologies. These microscopy methods have allowed for cellular structures to be observed in extremely fine detail. Other microscopy methods have allowed for the observation of dynamic cellular structures within live cells.

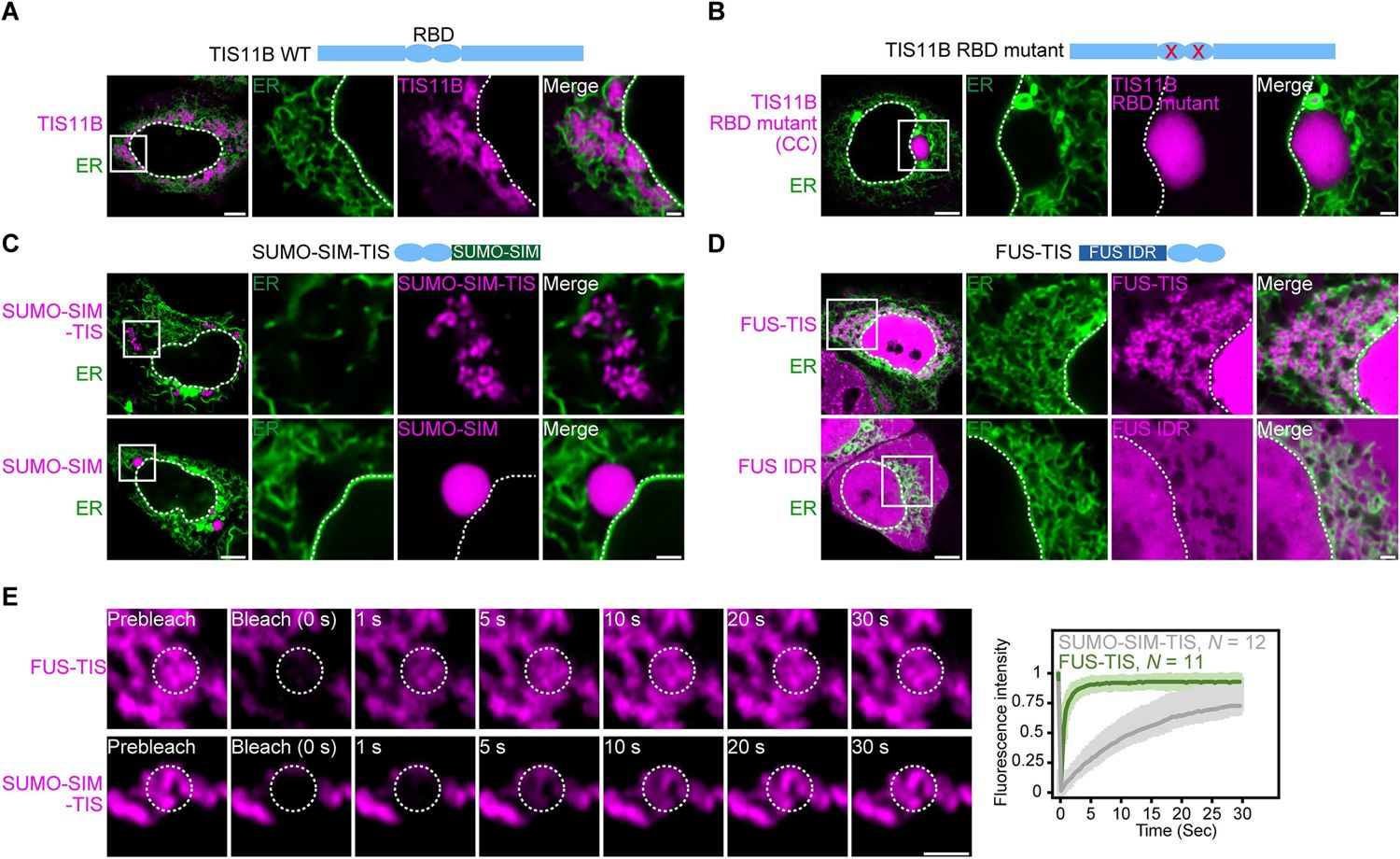
Image showing confocal microscopy imaging of TIS11B proteins in HeLa cells.

The TIGER domain is an extremely small structure in the cell, with many studies finding its appearance to be dot-like in the cell. One method utilized to image this structure has been Florescence Recovery After Photobleaching (FRAP). This technique utilizes fluorescent molecules to tag the specific cellular structure for visualization. These tags are then photobleached in a specific region, and then the organelle is observed after some time to see if other fluorescently tagged molecules moved into this region or if the regions fluorophores remained bleached. Through this method, researchers can observe cellular movement and organization in live cells, specifically pertaining to the tagged region. FRAP analysis has shown that TIS granules are dynamic molecules, with protein components capable of movement in the cell. The dynamic nature may possibly contribute to the mesh-like appearance of the TIGER domain, but more research in this area is required as all components of the domain are not yet known.

The TIGER domain has also been imaged through Airyscan imaging techniques, a type of super-resolution microscopy. This method of microscopy uses fluorescent tags to collect information from photons similarly to confocal microscopes, but this microscopy technique can collect photon information across a much larger area at a time. This technique can also be utilized for live cell imaging. Airyscan microscopy is able to detect TIS granules in the cell, and see how these structures interact with the ER to form the TIGER domain.

== Implications and Future Directions ==
Many membraneless organelles in the cell are involved in the functions of a variety of diseases in the body. This has prompted much research into therapies that can alleviate the symptoms of these diseases by targeting these organelles. In particular, TIS granules have been found to be related to inflammatory diseases. TIS granules are stress granules which form in response to internal or external stress on the cell. In some cells, this stress results from genetic defects in regulatory proteins that are meant to mediate inflammatory mRNA sequences in the cell. Genetic defects such as are associated with chronic inflammation in patients. Studies have found that increased expression of proteins in the tristetrapolin (TTP) family, such as TIS11B, has been shown to reduce inflammation in mice. Additionally, studies have found a deletion of these genes result in the development of chronic inflammation. The gene encoding for this protein has been conserved in both humans and mice, showing the possibility that this modification has implications as a possible therapeutic to decrease inflammation in humans as well. Specifically, this could hold implications for treatments of autoimmune disorders, which can cause inflammation all over the body. Suggested routes of therapeutic research include identifying molecules in the cell that affect TTP expression and changing their levels or increasing the mRNA stability of TTP proteins. Additional studies have linked the function of TIS granules to cardiac and neurological disorders, as well as cancers, but further research is required in these areas.

Further research on the TIGER domain is still required to understand this organelle and its structure, function, and implication in bodily processes and disease.
