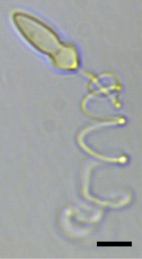
- A light micrograph of Polykrikos kofoidii showing an extruded nematocyst. Scale bar = 10µm.

Scientific classification
- Domain: Eukaryota
- Clade: Sar
- Clade: Alveolata
- Division: Dinoflagellata
- Class: Dinophyceae
- Order: Gymnodiniales
- Family: Polykrikaceae
- Genus: Polykrikos
- Species: P. kofoidii

Binomial name
- Polykrikos kofoidii Chatton, 1914

= Polykrikos kofoidii =

Species of single-celled organism

Polykrikos kofoidii is a species of phagotrophic marine pseudocolonial dinoflagellates that can capture and engulf other protist prey, including the toxic dinoflagellate, Alexandrium tamarense. P. kofoidii is of scientific interest due to its status as a predator of other dinoflagellates, a behavior that is significant in the control of algal blooms. It has a complex life cycle of both vegetative (asexual) and sexual reproduction complicated by its pseudocolonial structure.

P. kofoidii is bioluminescent, producing flashes of light that are slower than that of most other dinoflagellates. Based on its bioluminescence emission spectrum, which peaks at 474 nm, and its fluorescence emission spectrum, which peaks at 477 nm, its bioluminescence chemistry is similar to that of other dinoflagellates. Its most unusual feature is that luciferin appears to be distributed throughout the organism, unlike all other organisms in which luciferin appears as punctate sources due to its localization within scintillons. Its hybrid luciferase gene contains a luciferin-binding protein-like motif that has homology to that of the dinoflagellate Noctiluca scintillans but is different from that other luminescent dinoflagellates in which the luciferase and luciferin-binding protein genes are separate.
