= Nematopsides =

Scientific classification
- Domain: Eukaryota
- Clade: Sar
- Superphylum: Alveolata
- Phylum: Dinoflagellata
- Class: Dinophyceae
- Order: Gymnodiniales
- Family: Warnowiaceae
- Genus: Nematopsides; Greuet

Genus of single-celled organisms

Nematopsides is a genus of dinoflagellates belonging to the family Warnowiaceae.

Species:

- Nematopsides tentaculoides Greuet
- Nematopsides vigilans (Marshall) Greuet
