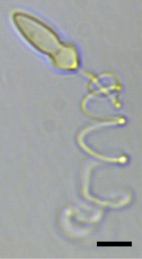
- A light micrograph of Polykrikos kofoidii showing an extruded nematocyst. Scale bar = 10µm.

Scientific classification
- Domain: Eukaryota
- Supergroup: Alveolata
- Division: Dinoflagellata
- Class: Dinophyceae
- Order: Gymnodiniales
- Family: Polykrikaceae
- Genus: Polykrikos; Bütschli, 1873

= Polykrikos =

Genus of single-celled organisms

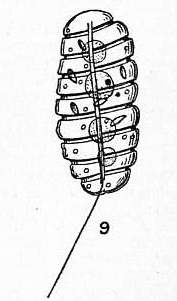
Polykrikos, Illustration after Butschli. Encyclopedia Britannica, 1911

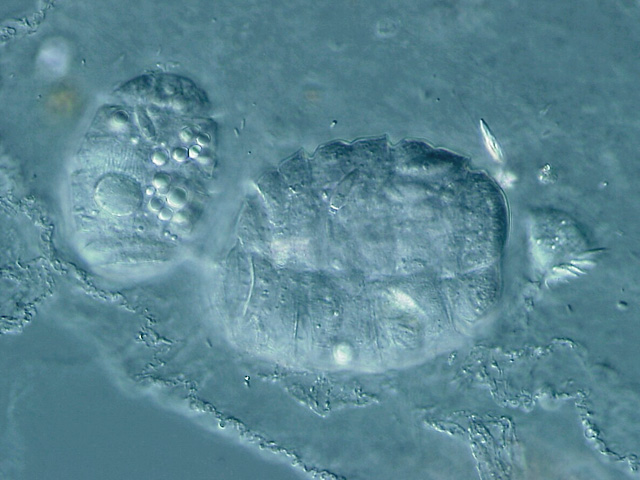
Polykrikos (left) and Strombidium (Ciliophora, right) from Tokyo bay, Yokohama.

Polykrikos (from Greek poly "many" krikos "ring, circle") is one of the genera of family Polykrikaceae that includes athecate pseudocolony-forming dinoflagellates. Polykrikos are characterized by a sophisticated ballistic apparatus, named the nematocyst-taeniocyst complex, which allows species to prey on a variety of organisms. Polykrikos have been found to regulate algal blooms as they feed on toxic dinoflagellates. However, there is also some data available on Polykrikos being toxic to fish.

== History of knowledge ==
Polykrikos was first seen in 1868 by Uljanin and was mistakenly considered as a metazoan larva of a turbellarian flatworms. In 1873 Butschili re-examined the specimen and concluded that the cell was an unusual ciliate, and Bergh later, in 1881, clarified Polykrikos dinoflagellate affinities.

== Morphology ==
Polykrikos is a colony of zooids (units of a colonial organism) that carry out simultaneous functions of a whole cell.

All Polykrikos species have: 1) a slightly curved longitudinal furrow, sulcus, extending to posterior end of the organism 2) a loop-shaped acrobase, which is an anterior extension from the sulcus 3) a transverse furrow, cingulum, with the displacement 4) taeniocyst-nematocyst complexes 5) two or four times less the number of nuclei than of zooids, and 6) ability to disassemble into pseudocolonies with fewer zooids and only one nucleus.

The most distinctive trait of this genus is the formation of multinucleated pseudocolonies that consist of an even number of zooids. Each zooid has a pair of flagella (transverse and longitudinal flagella) and has its own transverse groove, cingulum, but zooid longitudinal furrows, sulci, are fused. Transverse flagellum has the lateral projections, mastigonemes, and striated strand common to other dinoflagellates. Often Polykrikos have half the number of nuclei than zooids, and each pair of zooids shares a nucleus. Within the group there is some variation in which organelles are presented, but trichocysts, nematocysts, taeniocysts, mucocysts and plastids have been observed from different members within the taxon.

Cytoplasm of Polykrikos is characterized by numerous rough endoplasmic reticulum nets, Golgi complexes and vacuoles. Polykrikos are known to produce ejectile organelles, the extrusomes. One of them is a nematocyst formed in zooids. Another extrusome found within the organism is rod-shaped taeniocyst which is distally located to nematocyst and was earlier mistakenly considered as a nematocyst-precursor. Together these organelles are forming taeniocyst-nematocyst complex that is thought to be the best synapomorphy for Polykrikos clade. Golgi-derived vacuoles are shared by both organelles and supply each with molecules needed for its growth along with participating in NTC articulation. Organelles are located in proximity, but lie within different membranes and are separated by a passage, called "chute". The nematocyst is a larger organelle and lies posterior to taeniocyst. Some recent research have shown that the work of two organelles is coupled, with the taeniocyst adhering to prey, followed by nematocyst discharge leading to prey puncturing and, lastly, retrieving the prey using a tow filament, located on the end of the nematocysts close to posterior vesicle. The tubule, embedded within nematocyst, discharges towards the prey and hypothesized to be used for prey puncturing.

Furthermore, Gavelis et al. deeply examined NTC morphology and ballistic mechanism that were shown to be fundamentally different from cnidarians, demonstrating nematocysts have evolved independently in single-celled dinoflagellates. Encasing coiled tubule capsule, unlike in cnidarians, is sealed, which forces stylet upon firing first to puncture the capsule from within to free the filament, and only later to pierce the prey. As the tubule passes through the nozzle, it opens the operculum and uncoils after. Ballistics in cnidarians nematocysts is driven by synthesis of osmotic propellant poly gamma glutamate synthase, PgsAA, while in Polykrikos it is thought to occur due induced pressure as a result of capsular fibre contraction in the capsule wall. Nucleus is uniquely characterised by a double-layered fibrous cortex that underlines evaginated nuclear envelope; cortex is hypothesized to provide strength and shape to the nucleus, while nuclear evaginations are thought to increase nuclear-cytoplasmic exchange area at cortex perforation sites.

In Polykrikos, well-defined fibrous ribbons are involved in nuclear-flagellar connections, and anchoring to flagellar apparatus might serve in orientation of the nucleus in relation to flagella during processes of movement, mitosis and cell division.

== Plastids ==
There is a variation in nutrient acquisition among Polykrikos species as some exclusively rely on photosynthesis, some are mixothrophs, while some are obligate heterotrophs which makes Polykrikos a useful group to study for organellar evolution. Early-branching polykrikoids, Polykrikos geminatum and P. hartmanii, have three-membrane plastids with triple stacked thylakoids that are indicative of secondary peridinin-type plastids common for dinoflagellates. However, mixothrophic P. lebouriae, phylogenetically nested among heterothropic polykrikoids, has plastids atypical of dinoflagellates. It has two membranes and contain the double-stacked thylakoids that are found in diatoms and haptophytes. However, molecular data analysis by Gavelis et al. has demonstrated that P. lebouriae have peridinin-type plastids that were most likely acquired from ancestral polykrikoids. Transcriptomics analysis demonstrated multiple losses events in polykrikoids that might be explained from energetics and physiological restriction perspectives. Gradual increase in size of Polykrikos makes the organisms great predators, but increase in body size of single cells is known to result in increased self-shading of chloroplasts and decreased surface area to volume ratio, leading to decreased photosynthetic efficiency. Presence of specialised NTC and large cell size might have triggered multiple losses of photosynthesis.

== Life cycle of P. kofoidii ==
For the genus of Polykrikos, detailed data is available on reproduction of a type species (holotype) P. kofoidii, whose life cycle resembles general dinoflagellate cycle as vegetative cells form gametes that fuse to form a diploid (2n) zygote that could encyst, but pseudocolonial nature adds a number of peculiarities to the Polykrikos development.

When organisms were well-fed, they appeared as 4-zooid-2-nuclei pseudocolonies, and during vegetative reproduction doubled number of zooids followed by nuclei division leading to 8-zooid-4-nuclei stage with further transverse binary division into two 4-zooid-2-nuclei Polykrikos. Gamete formation was particular as pseudocolony produces 4 gametes of different sizes and morphologies than vegetative cells. Vegetative form doubled zooids and subsequently split into four gametes of a 2-zooid-1-nucleus form. Two gametes further paired up with their ventral sides and fused forming a planozygote. For P. kofoidii two copulation finger-shaped structures were observed in gametes that are presumably involved in gamete contact and fusion, but more data is needed to confirm this. The ventrally fused gametes required a complex rearrangement of eight flagella and formation of sulci and cinguli. The 4-zooid planozygote had only one nucleus and had two developmental pathways depending on food availability. Under starvation conditions the planozygote disassembled into two 2-zooid with one lacking nucleus, but further fate was not examined. Under culture conditions most organisms undergone meiosis and directly entered vegetative cycle. Very few planozygotes went through a resting cyst stage. The cyst stage persisted for 1 month, which is considered as a relatively short period in comparison to other dinoflagellates, which obligate dormancy period may reach up to 6 month. The duration of encystment is associated with ecological foraging strategies. Short dormancy period could facilitate rapid cycling between life cycle stages that could be beneficial to heterotrophic species in case of fluctuating food availability. However, possibility of chemical signalling involved in cyst hatching for Polykrikos is yet to be determined.

Germling, a single zooid cell, emerging from the cyst, had a unique development that has never been documented for any free-living dinoflagellate. Its morphology clearly went from a 1-zooid-1-nucleus, over a 2-zooid-1-nucleus, and a 4-zooid-1-nucleus into the 4-zooid-2-nucleus stage. This data raises the question whether such hatching pattern may reflect the Polykrikos pseudocolonies phylogeny.

== Habitat and ecology (niche, food) ==
All known Polykrikos species are found in marine environments. A majority of species are planktonic with theexception of Polykrikos lebouriae and Polykrikos herdmanae that are found in benthic habitat. There is also variation in feeding ecology as some species have plastids and can use photosynthesis to obtain nutrients but often happen to be mixotrophs (P. barnegatensis, P. lebouriae, P tanit, P. hartmannii). Only one species is known to be exclusively autotrophic (P. geminatum), while some lack the plastid and are completely heterotrophic (P. grassei, P. herdmanae, P. kofoidii and P. schwartzii),.

Polykrikos hartmannii is a phototrophic dinoflagellate and has been reported in waters of Canada, USA, Mexico, China, India, Japan, and Korea. P. hartmanii feeds on algal species by engulfment after anchoring a prey using a nematocyst-taeniocyst complex (later referred to as NTC). Tang et al. observed a P. hartmannii bloom that caused 100% mortality in juvenile sheepshead minnows (Cyprinodon variegates) within 24 hours suggesting P. hartmannii is an ichthyotoxic, harmful alga. P.hartmannii feeds on chain-forming dinoflagellates Cochlodinium polykrikoides and Gymnodinium catenatum that are also known to cause fish mortality, and therefore P. hartmannii is thought to have enzymes that detoxify toxins produced by these prey dinoflagellates. Also, a comparison of three Polykrikos species feeding revealed that species differ in their prey preference, and some are more specialized than the other, such that P. hartmanii preying is less diverse (fed on 2 prey species) than of P. kofoidii and P. lebouriae, which fed on 14 different algal species.

Predation by heterotrophic Polykrikos became a great topic of interest as some of the organisms graze on dinoflagellates that cause toxic blooms. High predation impact by Polykrikos schwartzii Butschili on toxic dinoflagellate Alexandrium tamarense (Lebour) Balech was reported in Argentina, while Polykrikos kofoidii Chatton was controlling Gymnodium catenatum Graham in Portuguese and Japanese coastal waters. G. catenatum is one of the species causing paralytic shellfish poisoning (PSP) and is found in waters of Australia, Japan, Mexico and Spain. Observations of feeding behaviour suggest P. kofoidii initially displayed looping swimming behaviour in close proximity to its prey followed by discharge of a nematocyst, pull of the prey into the body through posterior sulcus and final engulfment of the prey. PSP raises socio-economic-environmental concerns as it affects the health of both marine mammals and humans, and the regulation mechanism of toxic microalgae population by P.kofoidii could be important in environmental monitoring and health hazard elimination.

== Practical importance ==
Predation of toxic microalgae by heterotrophic dinoflagellates is one of the factors controlling the algal blooms. Polykrikos are known to modulate populations of dinoflagellates like Alexandrium tamarense, and G. catenatum, which are among prevalent agents of toxic algal blooms. Such heterothrophic polykrikoids may not only cut down on the toxicity levels induced by their prey in marine food webs, but can cease the toxic blooms and could be used in bioremediation. Thus, reduction in water toxicity may help regulate the balance of marine food webs and decrease mortality rates of finfish, marine mammals, and sea birds. Further studies on molecular mechanisms of detoxification by Polykrikos maybe helpful in biomedical and environment-monitoring fields.

However, some Polykrikos pose a health risk to certain fishes, while the bloom-regulating ones are often preyed on by marine invertebrates, like amphipods, which would return the toxins back into the food web. Some polykrikoid population monitoring and investigation of toxin dynamics inside the body of grazers could provide better understanding of plankton-based food webs, estimate degrees of poisoning in ecosystems and propose potential toxin elimination routes.

== List of species ==
Currently the following 10 species are accepted taxonomically:

- Polykrikos barnegatensis G.W.Martin,
- Polykrikos geminatus (F.Schütt) D.X.Qiu & Senjie Lin,
- Polykrikos grassei Lecal,
- Polykrikos hartmannii W.Zimmermann,
- Polykrikos herdmaniae Hoppenrath & Leander,
- Polykrikos kofoidii Chatton,
- Polykrikos lebouriae Herdman,
- Polykrikos schwartzii Bütschli,
- Polykrikos tanit Reñé,
- Polykrikos tentaculatus O.Wetzel
