= Vesiculo-vacuolar organelle =

Organelles present in endothelial cells of blood vessels

A vesiculo-vacuolar organelle (VVO) is an organelle that contributes to endothelial cell permeability. VVOs are found in the endothelium of normal blood vessels and vessels associated with tumors or allergic inflammation. VVOs, which cover the whole thickness of the vascular endothelium, are clusters of interconnected uncoated vesicles and vacuoles that resemble grapes and are surrounded by trilaminar unit membranes. These clusters have the ability to provide a trans-endothelial connection between the extravascular space and the vascular lumen.

VVOs actively transport fluid and macromolecules from the cytoplasm of endothelial cells into the blood vessel lumen, contributing to the increase in vascular permeability that occurs during the process of inflammation. This kind of transport is mediated by VEGF, one of the chemical mediators of inflammation.
