= Ocelloid =

Subcellular structure found in warnowiids

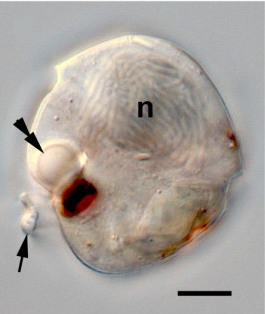
A light micrograph of an ocelloid-containing dinoflagellate. The nucleus is marked n, the ocelloid is indicated with a double arrowhead, and a posterior cell extension is indicated with an arrow; scale bar = 10 μm.

An ocelloid is a subcellular structure found in the family Warnowiaceae (warnowiids), which are members of a group of unicellular organisms known as dinoflagellates. The ocelloid is analogous in structure and function to the eyes of multicellular organisms, which focus, process and detect light. The ocelloid is much more complex than the eyespot, a light-sensitive structure also found in unicellular organisms, and is in fact one of the most complex known subcellular structures. It has been described as a striking example of convergent evolution.

== History ==
The ocelloid was originally described in 1884. Early descriptions were met with skepticism and hypothesized to represent the eye of a multicellular organism coincidentally engulfed by a single-celled organism. The possibility that it had an evolutionary relationship to plastids had been considered at least since the 1970s, although until the 2010s direct evidence was scarce.

== Structure ==
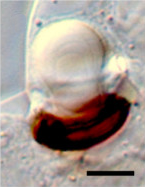
A micrograph of a single ocelloid; scale bar = 5 μm.

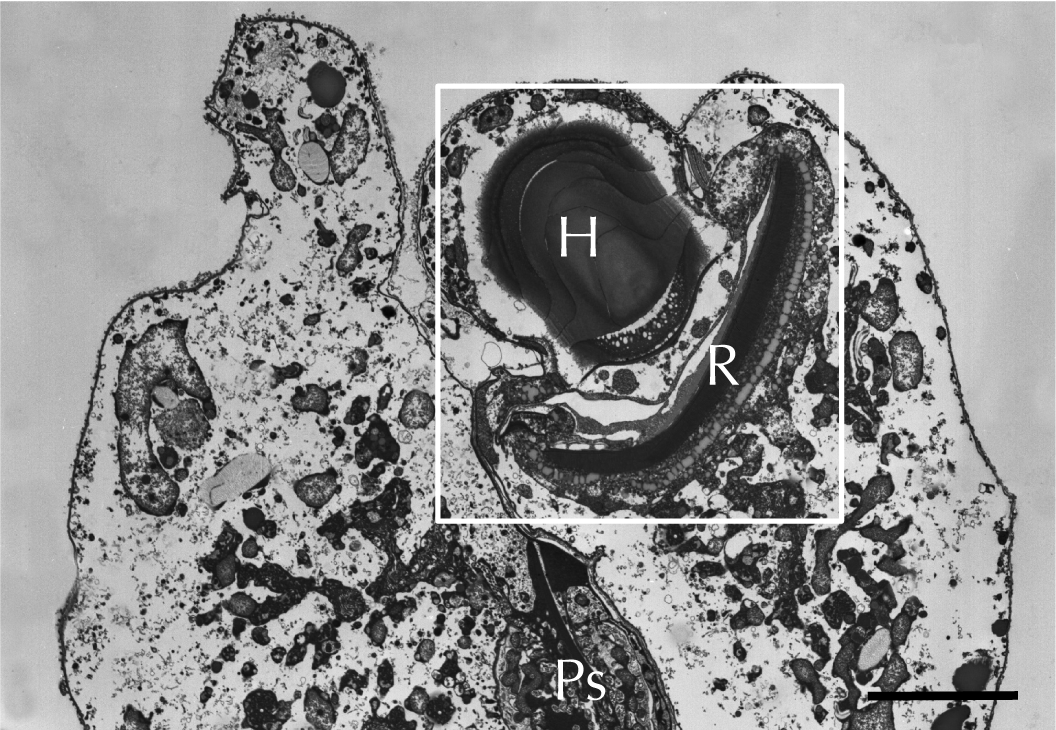
A negative staining transmission electron micrograph of an ocelloid (white box), indicating the hyalosome (H) and retinal body (R), as well as a portion of the piston (Ps). Scale bar = 10 μm.

Ocelloids contain subcomponents analogous to eye structures including the lens, cornea, iris, and retina. It can be divided into two substructures, the translucent, roundish hyalosome and the heavily pigmented melanosome, also known as the retinal body or pigment cup. The hyalosome serves as the refractive lens of the ocelloid; it is surrounded by a layer of mitochondria serving as the cornea and has constrictive rings analogous to the iris. The retinal body has internal structure reminiscent of thylakoid membranes in chloroplasts and contains proteins related to bacteriorhodopsin, a light-sensitive protein found in some archaea.

Using single-cell genomics and electron microscopy techniques, the ocelloid has been shown to consist of multiple membrane-bound organelles with distinct endosymbiotic origins deriving from multiple lineages of peridinin-containing plastids. This discovery received widespread attention in popular science media after it was reported in 2015.

== Function ==
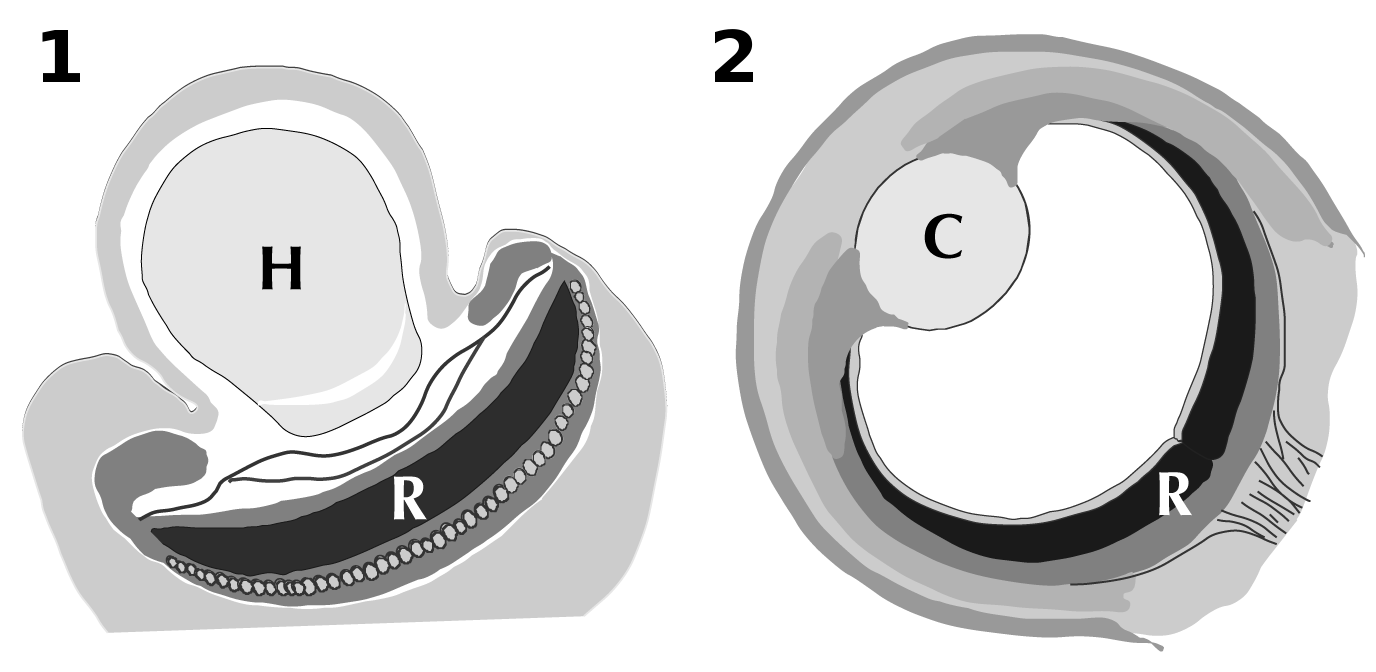
Comparison between the structures of the ocelloid (1) and the vertebrate eye (2). Components are indicated as the hyalosome (H), retinal body/retina (R), and crystallin lens (C).

Due to the strong structural resemblance between the ocelloid and metazoan eyes, it has long been speculated that the ocelloid functions as a photoreceptor; however, this is difficult to determine experimentally because warnowiids cannot be cultured in the laboratory, and isolates from natural habitats degrade quickly. It has been shown that the morphology of the ocelloid changes in response to environmental illumination, that the ocelloid structure can be disrupted by exposure to extremely bright light, and that it contains proteins with sequence similarity to known light-sensitive proteins. It has been speculated that the ocelloid aids in detecting prey, possibly other dinoflagellates.

== Evolution ==
Ocelloids are considered a synapomorphic character for the warnowiids - that is, they are present in all warnowiids and presumed present in the common ancestor, but are not present in the closest extant relatives, the polykrikoid dinoflagellates. These two groups share other unusually complex subcellular structures such as nematocysts and pistons.

The molecular evidence is compelling that ocelloids are composed of multiple endosymbionts: mitochondria and at least one type of plastid. Ocelloids are likely to be homologous to much less complex plastid-containing eyespots found in other, distantly related dinoflagellates.

== See also ==
- Evolution of the eye
- Eyespot apparatus
