= Desmotubule =

Structure in plant cells

Illustration of the plasmodesmata structure spanning the cell wall (CW). The desmotubule (DM) is shown as a continuation of the endoplasmic reticulum (ER), with various membrane proteins linking it to the plasma membrane (PM).

A desmotubule is an endomembrane derived structure of the plasmodesmata that connects the endoplasmic reticulum of two adjacent plant cells. The desmotubule is not actually a tubule but a compact, cylindrical segment of the ER that is found within the larger tubule structure of the plasmodesmata pore. Some, but not all, transport of the plasmodesmata occurs through the desmotubule.

== Structure ==
The desmotubule is a rod-like structure with a diameter of approximately 15 nm, making it one of the mostly highly compressed biological membrane structures known. Although it is usually appressed, the desmotubule can widen to form an internal lumen. The membranes that form the desmotubule are derived from the cortical endoplasmic reticulum and are embedded with proteins. These proteins connect the membrane of the desmotubule to the plasma membrane. Other proteins, consisting of mostly actin and myosin, form a helical structure which allows the transport of molecules through the cytoplasmic sleeve.

== Function ==
The desmotubule is involved in the lateral transfer of lipid molecules from one cell’s ER to another. These lipids are used in cell signaling pathways as a form of intracellular communication. There are three ways in which the desmotubule can facilitate the transfer of molecules: allowing them to flow through its internal lumen, letting them diffuse along its membrane, or attaching molecules on its cytoplasmic side and actively transporting them through the cytoplasmic sleeve of the plasmodesmata. Actin and myosin molecules attach at the cytoplasmic end of the desmotubule and can provide contractile force that closes its opening and regulates the movement of molecules through the pore. In addition, the proteins of the desmotubule help to provide structural support to the plasmodesmata.
