= Nematocyst (dinoflagellate) =

Subcellular structure in unicellular algae

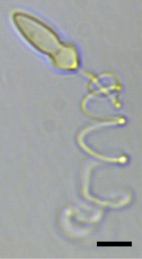
An extruded nematocyst from Polykrikos kofoidii. Scale bar = 10 μm.

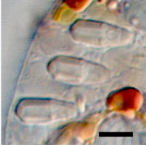
Nematocysts in Proterythropsis sp., from the warnowiid family. Scale bar = 5 μm.

A nematocyst is a subcellular structure or organelle containing extrusive filaments found in two families of athecate dinoflagellates (a group of unicellular eukaryotes), the Warnowiaceae and Polykrikaceae. It is distinct from the similar subcellular structures found in the cnidocyte cells of cnidarians, a group of multicellular organisms including jellyfish and corals; such structures are also often called nematocysts (alternatively, cnidocysts or cnidae), and cnidocytes are sometimes referred to as nematocytes. It is unclear whether the relationship between dinoflagellate and cnidarian nematocysts is a case of convergent evolution or common descent, although molecular evidence has been interpreted as supporting an endosymbiotic origin for cnidarian nematocysts.

In polykrikoids the nematocyst is found associated with another extrusive organelle called the taeniocyst, a complex that has been described as synapomorphic for the genus Polykrikos.

The full range of functional roles of the nematocyst is not well understood, but it has been observed to be involved in prey capture and feeding.
