= Trichocyst =

Organelle

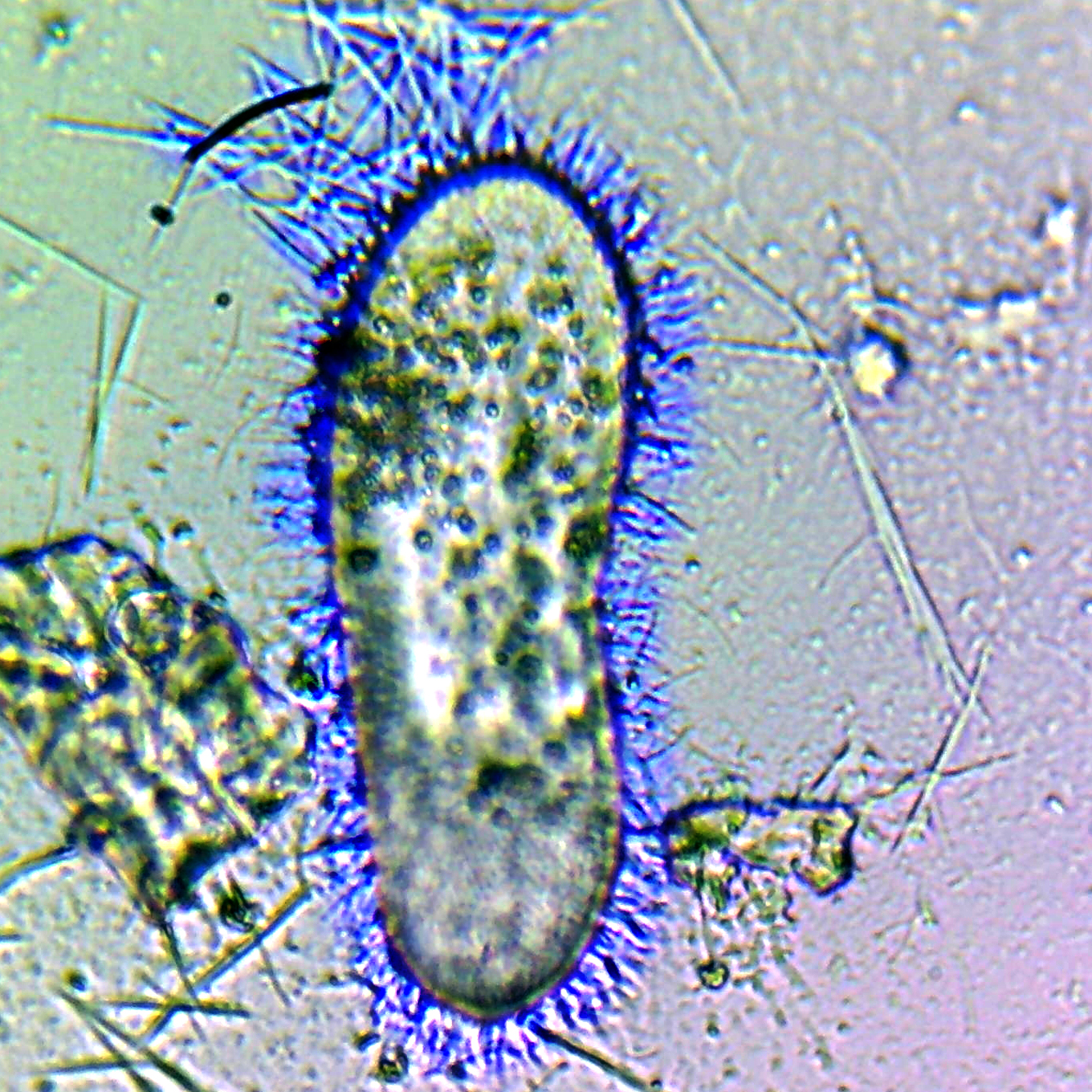
Paramecium tetraurelia, a ciliate, with discharged trichocysts (artificially colored in blue).

A trichocyst is an organelle found in certain ciliates and dinoflagellates.

A trichocyst can be found in tetrahymena and along cila pathways of several metabolic systems.

It is also a structure in the cortex of certain ciliate and flagellate protozoans consisting of a cavity and long, thin threads that can be ejected in response to certain stimuli. Trichocysts may be widely distributed over an organism or restricted to certain areas (e.g., tentacles, papillae, around the mouth). There are several types. Mucoid trichocysts are elongated inclusions that may be ejected as visible bodies after artificial stimulation. Filamentous trichocysts in Paramecium and other ciliates are discharged as filaments composed of a cross-striated shaft and a tip. Toxicysts (in Dileptus and certain other carnivorous protozoans) tend to be localized around the mouth. When discharged, a toxicyst expels a long, nonstriated filament with a rodlike tip, which paralyzes or kills other microorganisms; this filament is used to capture food and, presumably, in defense.

The functional significance of other trichocysts is uncertain, although those of Paramecium apparently can be extruded for anchorage during feeding.
