= Organelle =

Specialized subunit within a cell

Details
- Pronunciation: /ɔːrɡəˈnɛl/
- Part of: Cell

Identifiers
- Latin: organella
- MeSH: D015388
- TH: H1.00.01.0.00009
- FMA: 63832

An organelle is a specialized subunit, within a biological cell, that has a specific function. The name organelle comes from the idea that these structures are parts of cells, as organs are to the body, hence organelle, the suffix -elle being a diminutive. Organelles are either separately enclosed within their own lipid bilayers (also called membrane-bound organelles) or are spatially distinct functional units without a surrounding lipid bilayer (non-membrane bounded organelles). Although most organelles are functional units within cells, some functional units that extend outside of cells are often termed organelles, such as cilia, the flagellum and archaellum, and the trichocyst (these could be referred to as membrane bound in the sense that they are attached to (or bound to) the membrane).

Organelles are identified by microscopy, and can also be purified by cell fractionation. There are many types of organelles, particularly in eukaryotic cells. They include structures that make up the endomembrane system (such as the nuclear envelope, endoplasmic reticulum, and Golgi apparatus), and other structures such as mitochondria and plastids. While prokaryotes do not possess eukaryotic organelles, some do contain protein-shelled bacterial microcompartments, which are thought to act as primitive prokaryotic organelles; and there is also evidence of other membrane-bounded structures. Also, the prokaryotic flagellum which protrudes outside the cell, and its motor, as well as the largely extracellular pilus, are often spoken of as organelles.

== History and terminology ==
Cell biology
- Animal cell diagram
- Components of a typical animal cell: 1. Nucleolus; 2. Nucleus; 3. Ribosome (dots as part of 5); 4. Vesicle; 5. Rough endoplasmic reticulum 6. Golgi apparatus (or, Golgi body); 7. Cytoskeleton; 8. Smooth endoplasmic reticulum 9. Mitochondrion; 10. Vacuole; 11. Cytosol (fluid that contains organelles; with which, comprises cytoplasm); 12. Lysosome; 13. Centrosome; 14. Cell membrane

In biology, organs are defined as confined functional units within an organism. The analogy of bodily organs to microscopic cellular substructures is obvious, as from even early works, authors of respective textbooks rarely elaborate on the distinction between the two.

In the 1830s, Félix Dujardin refuted Ehrenberg's theory that microorganisms have the same organs as multicellular animals, only smaller.

Credited as the first to use a diminutive of organ (i.e., little organ) for cellular structures was German zoologist Karl August Möbius (1884), who used the term organula (plural of organulum, the diminutive of Latin organum). In a footnote, which was published as a correction in the next issue of the journal, he justified his suggestion to call organs of unicellular organisms "organella" since they are only differently formed parts of one cell, in contrast to multicellular organs of multicellular organisms.

== Types ==
In the broadest definition, an organelle is any part of the cell that acts as a distinct functional unit. This includes membrane-bound as well as non-membrane-bound, or membrane-less organelles. In a more restrictive definition, only membrane-bound ones are included. In the most restrictive definition, only the endosymbiotic membrane-bound ones are included.

The membrane-bound organelles include the endosymbiotic (mitochondria and plastids) and components formed by the endomembrane system such as the lysosome. An endomembrane system and mitochondria are found in almost all eukaryotes. Plants, algae, and some protists additionally have chloroplasts. A very small minority of bacteria also have a sort-of endomembrane system.

The membrane-less organelles (MLOs), also called biomolecular complexes, are large assemblies of macromolecules that carry out particular and specialized functions, but are membrane-less. Many of these are referred to as "proteinaceous organelles" as their main structure is made of proteins. MLOs include:

- large RNA and protein complexes: ribosome, spliceosome, vault
- large protein complexes: proteasome, DNA polymerase III holoenzyme, RNA polymerase II holoenzyme, symmetric viral capsids, complex of GroEL and GroES; membrane protein complexes: porosome, photosystem I, ATP synthase
- large DNA and protein complexes: nucleosome
- centriole and microtubule-organizing center (MTOC)
- cytoskeleton
- flagellum
- nucleolus
- stress granule
- germ cell granule
- neuronal transport granule

The mechanisms by which such non-membrane bounded organelles form and retain their spatial integrity have been likened to liquid-liquid phase separation.

== Eukaryotic organelles ==
Diagram showing the organelles of a generalised animal cell

Eukaryotic cells are structurally complex, and by definition are organized, in part, by interior compartments that are themselves enclosed by lipid membranes that resemble the outermost cell membrane. The larger organelles, such as the nucleus and vacuoles, are easily visible with the light microscope. They were among the first biological discoveries made after the invention of the microscope.

Not all eukaryotic cells have each of the organelles listed below. Exceptional organisms have cells that do not include some organelles (such as mitochondria) that might otherwise be considered universal to eukaryotes. The several plastids including chloroplasts are distributed among some but not all eukaryotes.

There are also occasional exceptions to the number of membranes surrounding organelles, listed in the tables below (e.g., some that are listed as double-membrane are sometimes found with single or triple membranes). In addition, the number of individual organelles of each type found in a given cell varies depending upon the function of that cell. The cell membrane and cell wall are not organelles.

Major eukaryotic organelles
Organelle	Main function	Structure	Organisms	Notes
chloroplast (plastid)	photosynthesis, traps energy from sunlight	double-membrane compartment	plants, algae, rare kleptoplastic organisms	has own DNA; theorized to be engulfed by the ancestral archaeplastid cell (endosymbiosis)
endoplasmic reticulum	translation and folding of new proteins (rough endoplasmic reticulum), expression of lipids (smooth endoplasmic reticulum)	single-membrane compartment	all eukaryotes	rough endoplasmic reticulum is covered with ribosomes (which are bound to the ribosome membrane), has folds that are flat sacs; smooth endoplasmic reticulum has folds that are tubular
flagellum	locomotion, sensory	protein	some eukaryotes	
Golgi apparatus	sorting, packaging, processing and modification of proteins	single-membrane compartment	all eukaryotes	cis-face (convex) nearest to rough endoplasmic reticulum; trans-face (concave) farthest from rough endoplasmic reticulum
mitochondrion	energy production from the oxidation of glucose substances and the release of adenosine triphosphate	double-membrane compartment	most eukaryotes	constituting element of the chondriome; has own DNA; theorized to have been engulfed by an ancestral eukaryotic cell (endosymbiosis)
nucleus	DNA maintenance, controls all activities of the cell, RNA transcription	double-membrane compartment	all eukaryotes	contains bulk of genome
vacuole	storage, transportation, helps maintain homeostasis	single-membrane compartment	all eukaryotes	

Minor eukaryotic organelles and cell components
Organelle/Macromolecule	Main function	Structure	Organisms
acrosome	helps spermatozoa fuse with ovum	single-membrane compartment	most animals (including sponges)
autophagosome	vesicle that sequesters cytoplasmic material and organelles for degradation	double-membrane compartment	all eukaryotes
centriole	anchor for cytoskeleton, organizes cell division by forming spindle fibers	Microtubule protein	animals
cilium	movement in or of external medium; "critical developmental signaling pathway".	Microtubule protein	animals, protists, few plants
cnidocyst	stinging	coiled hollow tubule	cnidarians
eyespot apparatus	detects light, allowing phototaxis to take place		green algae and other unicellular photosynthetic organisms such as euglenids
glycosome	carries out glycolysis	single-membrane compartment	Some protozoa, such as Trypanosomes.
glyoxysome	conversion of fat into sugars	single-membrane compartment	plants
hydrogenosome	energy & hydrogen production	double-membrane compartment	a few unicellular eukaryotes
lysosome	breakdown of large molecules (e.g., proteins + polysaccharides)	single-membrane compartment	animals
melanosome	pigment storage	single-membrane compartment	animals
mitosome	probably plays a role in iron–sulfur cluster (Fe–S) assembly	double-membrane compartment	a few unicellular eukaryotes that lack mitochondria
myofibril	myocyte contraction	bundled filaments	animals
nucleolus	pre-ribosome production	protein–DNA–RNA	most eukaryotes
ocelloid	detects light and possibly shapes, allowing phototaxis to take place	double-membrane compartment	members of the family Warnowiaceae
parenthesome	not characterized	not characterized	fungi
peroxisome	breakdown of metabolic hydrogen peroxide	single-membrane compartment	all eukaryotes
porosome	secretory portal	single-membrane compartment	all eukaryotes
proteasome	degradation of unneeded or damaged proteins by proteolysis	very large protein complex	all eukaryotes, all archaea, and some bacteria
ribosome (80S)	translation of RNA into proteins	RNA-protein	all organisms
stress granule	mRNA storage	mRNP complexes	most eukaryotes
TIGER domain	mRNA encoding proteins	network of RNA-binding proteins	most organisms
vault	unclear; possibly nuclear-cytoplasmic transport	RNA-protein	most eukaryotes (including all higher eukaryotes)
vesicle	material transport	single-membrane compartment	all eukaryotes

Other related structures:

- cytosol
- endomembrane system
- nucleosome
- microtubule

== Prokaryotic organelles ==
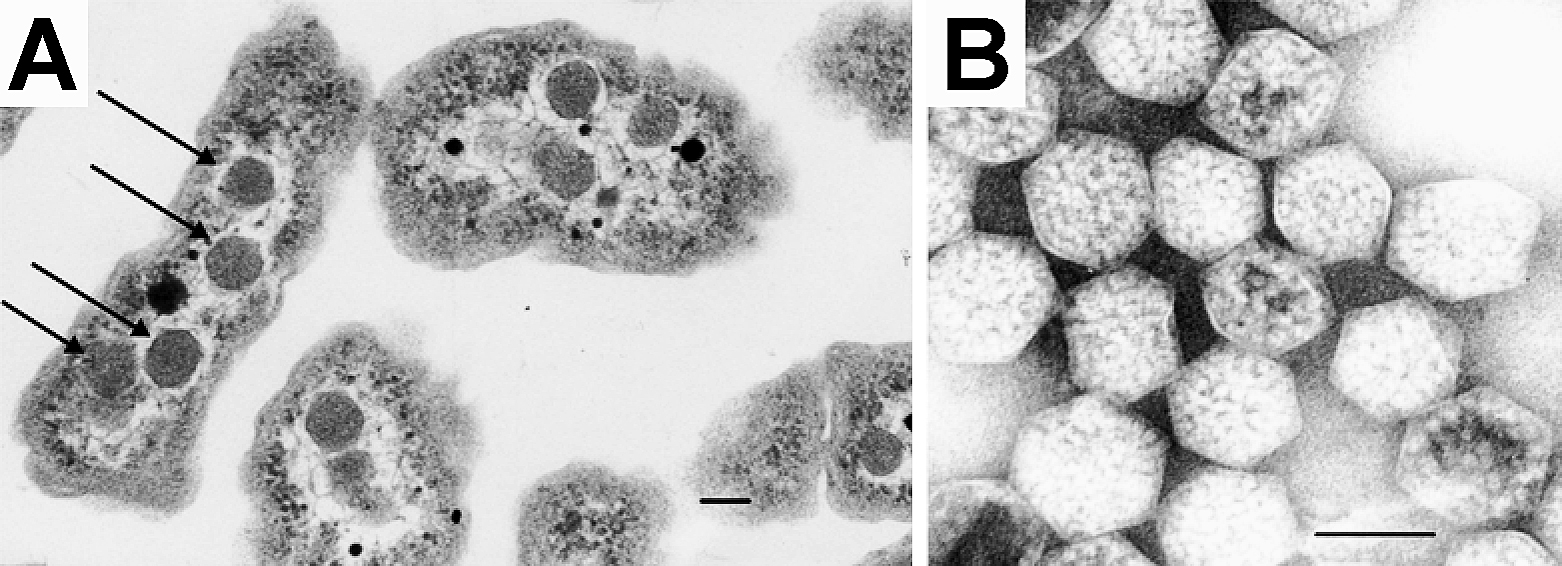
(A) Electron micrograph of Halothiobacillus neapolitanus cells, arrows highlight carboxysomes. (B) Image of intact carboxysomes isolated from H. neapolitanus. Scale bars are 100 nm.

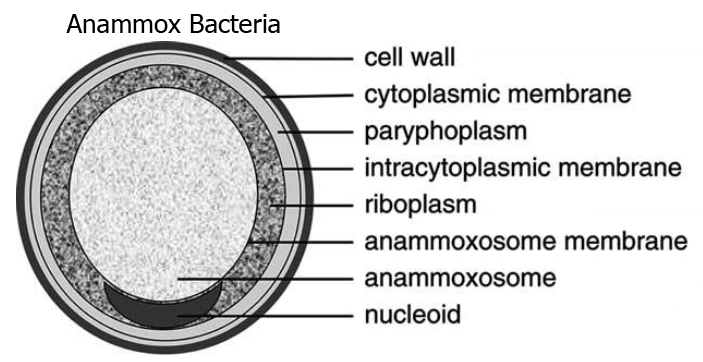
Structure of Candidatus Brocadia anammoxidans, showing an anammoxosome and intracytoplasmic membrane

Prokaryotes are not as structurally complex as eukaryotes, and were once thought to have little internal organization, and lack cellular compartments and internal membranes; but slowly, details are emerging about prokaryotic internal structures that overturn these assumptions. An early false turn was the idea developed in the 1970s that bacteria might contain cell membrane folds termed mesosomes, but these were later shown to be artifacts produced by the chemicals used to prepare the cells for electron microscopy.

However, there is increasing evidence of compartmentalization in at least some prokaryotes. Research has revealed that at least some bacteria have microcompartments, such as carboxysomes. These subcellular compartments are 100–200 nm in diameter and are enclosed by a shell of proteins. Even more striking is the description of membrane-bound magnetosomes in magnetotactic bacteria, reported in 2006.

The bacterial phylum Planctomycetota has revealed a number of compartmentalization features. The Planctomycetota cell plan includes intracytoplasmic membranes that separates the cytoplasm into paryphoplasm (an outer ribosome-free space) and pirellulosome (or riboplasm, an inner ribosome-containing space). Membrane-bounded anammoxosomes have been discovered in five Planctomycetota "anammox" genera, which perform anaerobic ammonium oxidation. In the Planctomycetota species Gemmata obscuriglobus, a nucleus-like structure surrounded by lipid membranes has been reported.

Compartmentalization is a feature of prokaryotic photosynthetic structures. Purple bacteria have "chromatophores", which are reaction centers found in invaginations of the cell membrane. Green sulfur bacteria have chlorosomes, which are photosynthetic antenna complexes found bonded to cell membranes. Cyanobacteria have internal thylakoid membranes for light-dependent photosynthesis; studies have revealed that the cell membrane and the thylakoid membranes are not continuous with each other.

Advances in synthetic biology have enabled the construction of artificial bacterial organelles that are more reminiscent to eukaryotic ones, including structures formed through liquid-liquid phase separation of "RNA organelle" reported in 2017. These RNA systems termed TEARS is capable of regulating compartmentalize cellular processes, scaffolding and sequestering metabolic pathways. These synthetic organelles can be repurposed as their eukaryotic counterparts, to isolate purify proteins within prokaryotes, enabling a technology termed PandaPure for chromatography-free purification.

Prokaryotic non-membranous organelles and cell components
Organelle/macromolecule	Main function	Structure	Organisms
nucleoid	DNA maintenance, transcription to RNA	DNA-protein	bacteria and archaea
ribosome (70S)	translation of RNA into proteins	RNA-protein	bacteria and archaea
plasmid	DNA exchange	circular DNA	some bacteria and archaea
carboxysome	carbon fixation	protein-shell bacterial microcompartment	some bacteria
flagellum	movement in external medium	protein filament	some prokaryotes
pilus	Adhesion to other cells for conjugation or to a solid substrate to create motile forces.	a hair-like appendage sticking out (though partially embedded into) the plasma membrane	some prokaryotes

Prokaryotic membranous organelles and cell components
Organelle/macromolecule	Main function	Structure	Organisms
anammoxosome	anaerobic ammonium oxidation	ladderane lipid membrane	"Candidatus" bacteria within Planctomycetota
chlorosome	photosynthesis	phospholipid-bounded light-harvesting complex attached to cell membrane	green sulfur bacteria
magnetosome	magnetic orientation	inorganic crystal, lipid membrane	magnetotactic bacteria
thylakoid	photosynthesis	photosystem proteins and pigments in membranes	mostly cyanobacteria
pepin	containing DNA and ribosomes	membrane	"Ca. Thiomargarita magnifica"

== See also ==
- CoRR hypothesis
- Ejectosome
- Endosymbiotic theory
- Organelle biogenesis
- Membrane vesicle trafficking
- Host–pathogen interaction
- Vesiculo-vacuolar organelle
