= Human skeleton =

Internal framework of the human body

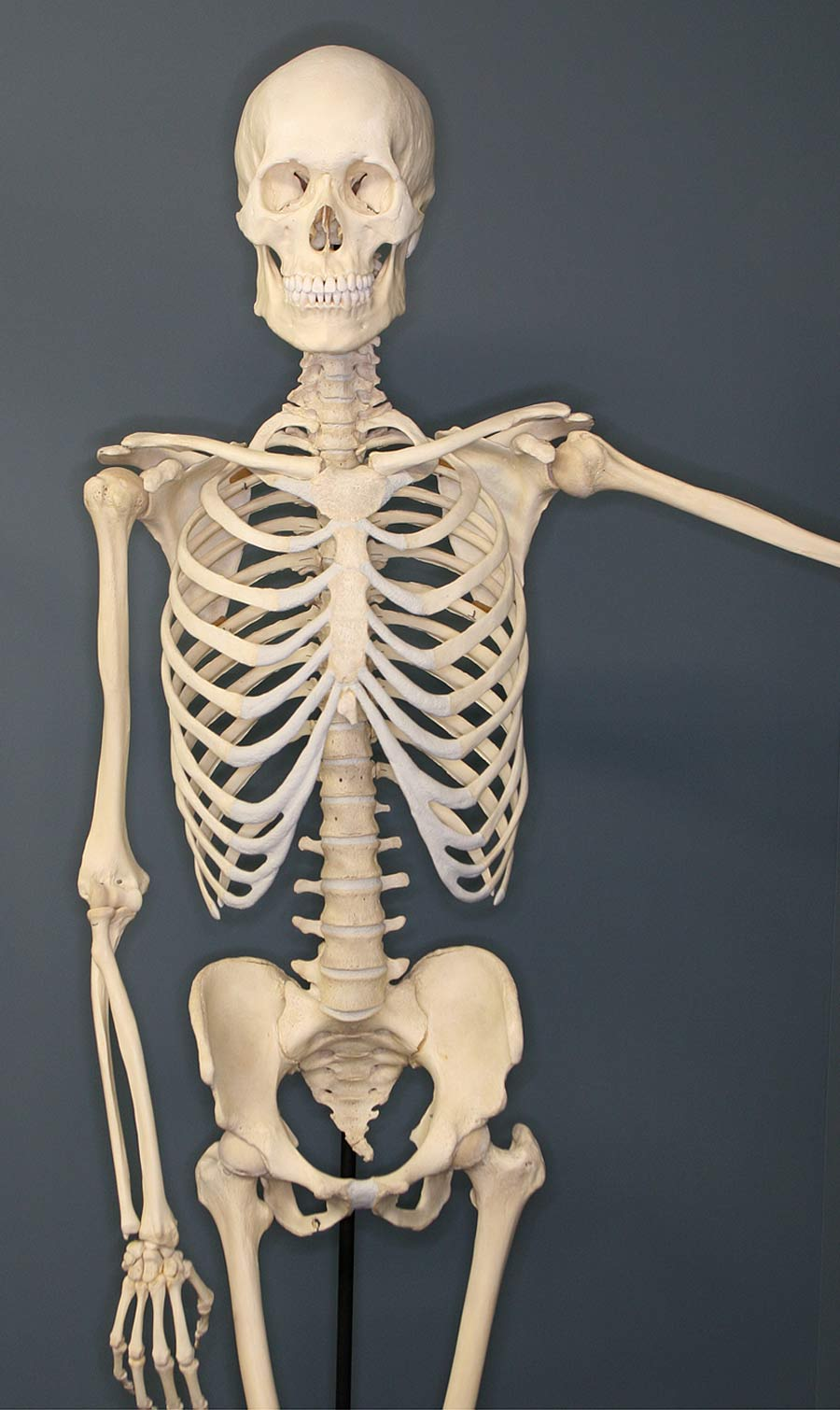
- A human skeleton on exhibit at the Museum of Osteology, Oklahoma City, Oklahoma

Details

Identifiers
- Greek: σκελετός
- TA98: A02.0.00.000
- TA2: 352
- FMA: 23881

The human skeleton is the internal framework of the human body. It is composed of around 270 bones at birth – this total decreases to around 206 bones by adulthood after some bones fuse together, not counting accessory bones. The bone mass in the skeleton makes up about 14% of the total body weight (ca. 10–11 kg for an average person) and reaches maximum mass between the ages of 25 and 30. The human skeleton can be divided into the axial skeleton and the appendicular skeleton. The axial skeleton is formed by the spinal column, the rib cage, the skull, and associated bones. The appendicular skeleton, which is attached to the axial skeleton, is formed by the shoulder girdle, the pelvic girdle and the bones of the upper and lower limbs.

The human skeleton performs six major functions: support, movement, protection, production of blood cells, storage of minerals, and endocrine regulation.

The human skeleton is not as sexually dimorphic as that of many other primate species, but subtle differences between sexes in the morphology of the skull, dentition, long bones, and pelvis exist. In general, female skeletal elements tend to be smaller and less robust than corresponding male elements within a given population. The human female pelvis is also different from that of males in order to facilitate childbirth. Unlike most primates, human males do not have penile bones.

== Divisions ==
=== Axial ===
The axial skeleton (80 bones) is formed by the vertebral column (32–34 bones, depending on the number of elements in sacrum and coccyx), the non-cartilage parts of the rib cage (12 pairs of ribs and the sternum), and the skull (22 bones; some sources add 7 associated bones).

The upright posture of humans is maintained by the axial skeleton, which transmits the weight from the head, the trunk, and the upper extremities down to the lower extremities at the hip joints. The bones of the spine are supported by many ligaments. The erector spinae muscles are also supporting and are useful for balance.

=== Appendicular ===
The appendicular skeleton (126 bones) is formed by the pectoral girdles, the upper limbs, the pelvic girdle or pelvis, and the lower limbs. Their functions are to make locomotion possible and to protect the major organs of digestion, excretion and reproduction.

== Functions ==
The skeleton serves six major functions: support, movement, protection, production of blood cells, storage of minerals and endocrine regulation.

=== Support ===
The skeleton provides the framework which supports the body and maintains its shape. The pelvis, associated ligaments and muscles provide a floor for the pelvic structures. Without the rib cages, costal cartilages, and intercostal muscles, the lungs would collapse.

=== Movement ===
The joints between bones allow movement, some allowing a wider range of movement than others, e.g. the ball and socket joint allows a greater range of movement than the pivot joint at the neck. Movement is powered by skeletal muscles, which are attached to the skeleton at various sites on bones. Muscles, bones, and joints provide the principal mechanics for movement, all coordinated by the nervous system.

It is believed that the reduction of human bone density in prehistoric times reduced the agility and dexterity of human movement. Shifting from hunting to agriculture has caused human bone density to reduce significantly.

=== Protection ===
The skeleton helps to protect many vital internal organs from being damaged.

- The skull protects the brain
- The vertebrae protect the spinal cord.
- The rib cage, spine, and sternum protect the lungs, heart and major blood vessels.

=== Blood cell production ===
The skeleton is the site of haematopoiesis, the development of blood cells that takes place in the bone marrow. In children, haematopoiesis occurs primarily in the marrow of the long bones such as the femur and tibia. In adults, it occurs mainly in the pelvis, cranium, vertebrae, and sternum.

=== Storage ===
The bone matrix can store calcium and is involved in calcium metabolism, and bone marrow can store iron in ferritin and is involved in iron metabolism. However, bones are not entirely made of calcium, but a mixture of chondroitin sulfate and hydroxyapatite, the latter making up 70% of a bone. Hydroxyapatite is in turn composed of 39.8% of calcium, 41.4% of oxygen, 18.5% of phosphorus, and 0.2% of hydrogen by mass. Chondroitin sulfate is a sugar made up primarily of oxygen and carbon.

=== Endocrine regulation ===
Bone cells release a hormone called osteocalcin, which contributes to the regulation of blood sugar (glucose) and fat deposition. Osteocalcin increases both insulin secretion and sensitivity, in addition to boosting the number of insulin-producing cells and reducing stores of fat.

== Sex differences ==
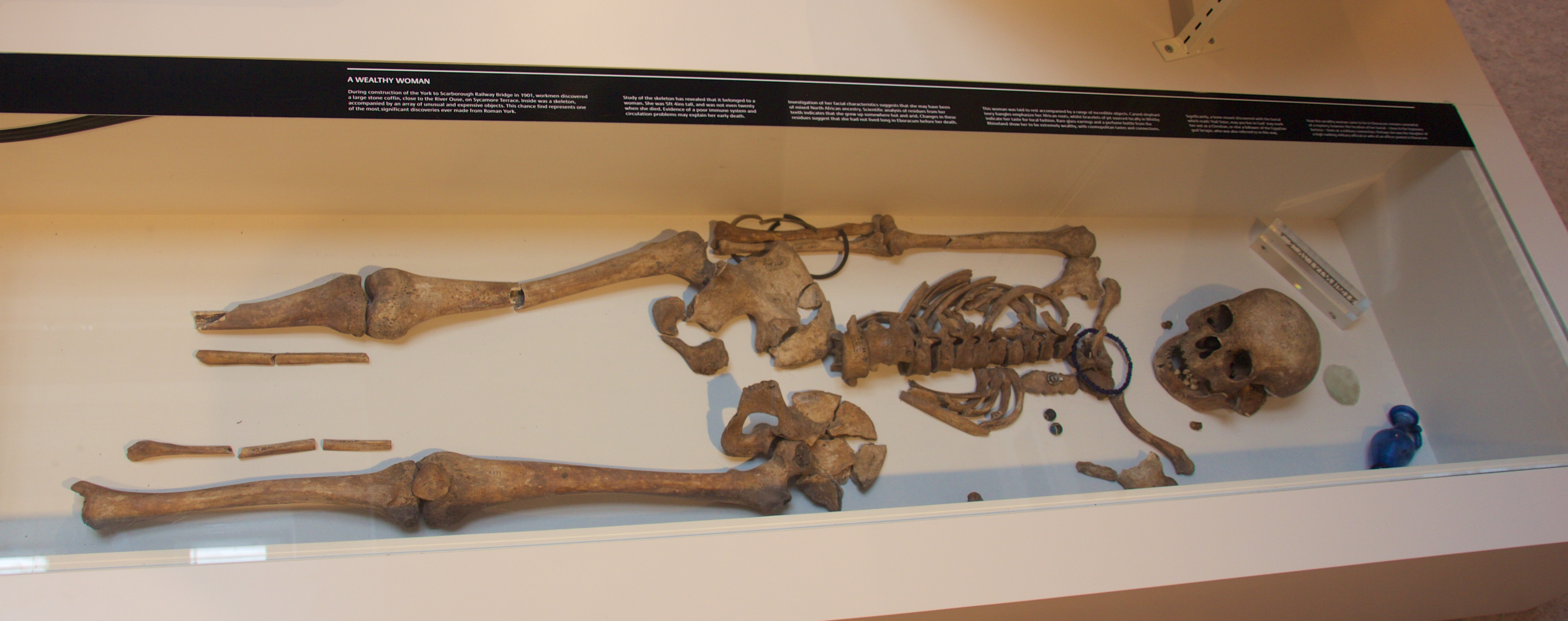
During construction of the York to Scarborough Railway Bridge in 1901, workmen discovered a large stone coffin, close to the River Ouse. Inside was a skeleton, accompanied by an array of unusual and expensive objects. This chance find represents one of the most significant discoveries ever made from Roman York. Study of the skeleton has revealed that it belonged to a woman.

Anatomical differences between human males and females are highly pronounced in some soft tissue areas, but tend to be limited in the skeleton. The human skeleton is not as sexually dimorphic as that of many other primate species, but subtle differences between sexes in the morphology of the skull, dentition, long bones, and pelvis are exhibited across human populations. In general, female skeletal elements tend to be smaller and less robust than corresponding male elements within a given population. It is not known whether or to what extent those differences are genetic or environmental.

=== Skull ===
A variety of gross morphological traits of the human skull demonstrate sexual dimorphism, such as the median nuchal line, mastoid processes, supraorbital margin, supraorbital ridge, and the chin.

=== Dentition ===
Human inter-sex dental dimorphism centers on the canine teeth, but it is not nearly as pronounced as in the other great apes.

=== Long bones ===
Long bones are generally larger in males than in females within a given population. Muscle attachment sites on long bones are often more robust in males than in females, reflecting a difference in overall muscle mass and development between sexes. Sexual dimorphism in the long bones is commonly characterized by morphometric or gross morphological analyses.

=== Pelvis ===
The human pelvis exhibits greater sexual dimorphism than other bones, specifically in the size and shape of the pelvic cavity, ilia, greater sciatic notches, and the sub-pubic angle. The Phenice method is commonly used to determine the sex of an unidentified human skeleton by anthropologists with 96% to 100% accuracy in some populations.

Women's pelvises are wider in the pelvic inlet and are wider throughout the pelvis to allow for child birth. The sacrum in the women's pelvis is curved inwards to allow the child to have a "funnel" to assist in the child's pathway from the uterus to the birth canal.

== Clinical significance ==
There are many classified skeletal disorders. One of the most common is osteoporosis. Also common is scoliosis, a side-to-side curve in the back or spine, often creating a pronounced "C" or "S" shape when viewed on an x-ray of the spine. This condition is most apparent during adolescence, and is most common with females.

=== Arthritis ===
Arthritis is a disorder of the joints. It involves inflammation of one or more joints. When affected by arthritis, the joint or joints affected may be painful to move, may move in unusual directions or may be immobile completely. The symptoms of arthritis will vary differently between types of arthritis. The most common form of arthritis, osteoarthritis, can affect both the larger and smaller joints of the human skeleton. The cartilage in the affected joints will degrade, soften and wear away. This decreases the mobility of the joints and decreases the space between bones where cartilage should be.

=== Osteoporosis ===
Osteoporosis is a disease of bone where there is reduced bone mineral density, increasing the likelihood of fractures. Osteoporosis is defined by the World Health Organization in women as a bone mineral density 2.5 standard deviations below peak bone mass, relative to the age and sex-matched average, as measured by dual energy X-ray absorptiometry, with the term "established osteoporosis" including the presence of a fragility fracture. Osteoporosis is most common in women after menopause, when it is called "postmenopausal osteoporosis", but may develop in men and premenopausal women in the presence of particular hormonal disorders and other chronic diseases or as a result of smoking and medications, specifically glucocorticoids. Osteoporosis usually has no symptoms until a fracture occurs. For this reason, DEXA scans are often done in people with one or more risk factors, who have developed osteoporosis and are at risk of fracture.

Osteoporosis treatment includes advice to stop smoking, decrease alcohol consumption, exercise regularly, and have a healthy diet. Calcium supplements may also be advised, as may vitamin D. When medication is used, it may include bisphosphonates, strontium ranelate, and osteoporosis may be one factor considered when commencing hormone replacement therapy.

== History ==
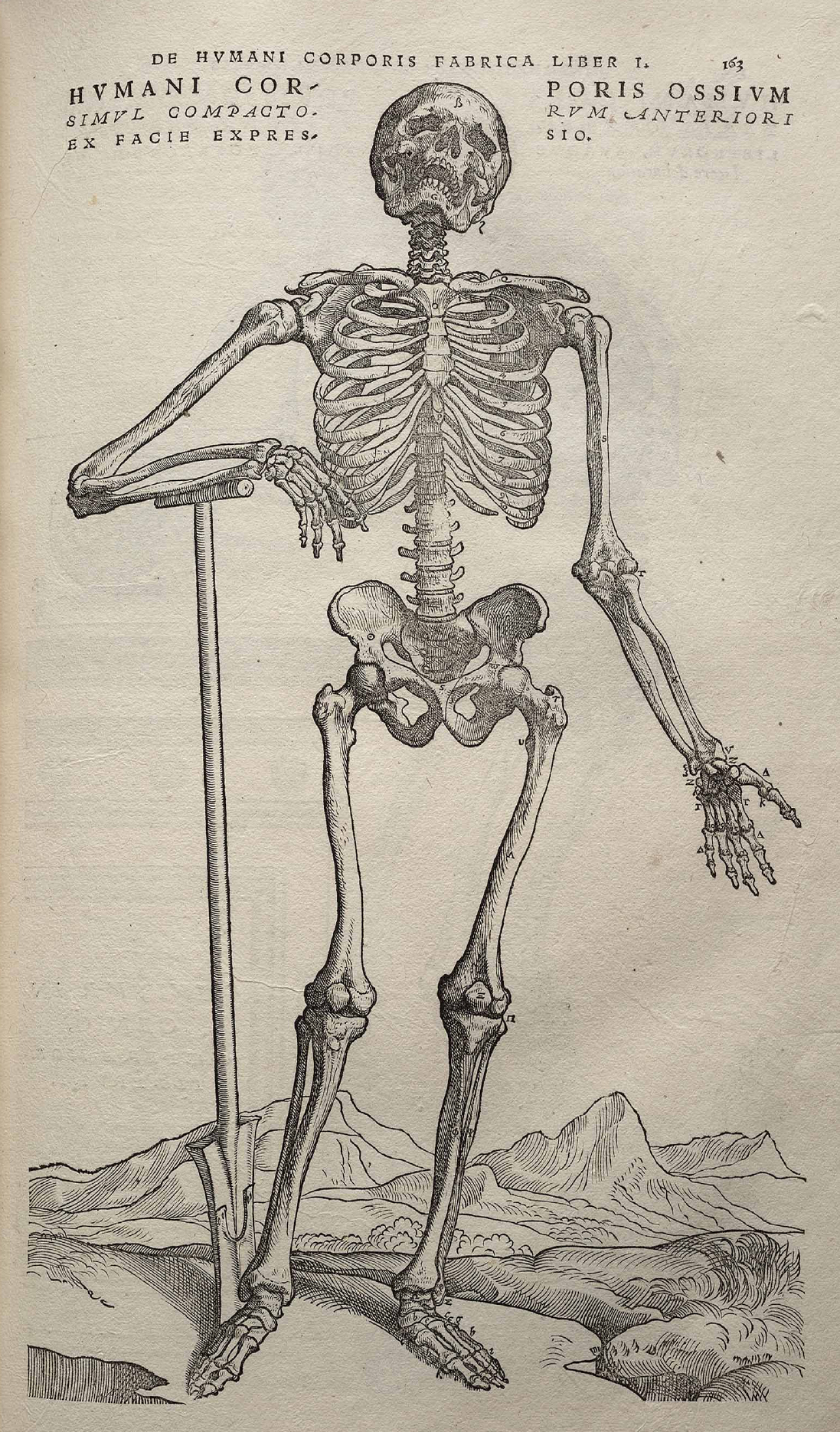
Image from Andreas Vesalius' De humani corporis fabrica (1543), page 163.

=== India ===
The Sushruta Samhita, composed between the 6th century BCE and 5th century CE speaks of 360 bones. Books on Salya-Shastra (surgical science) know of only 300. The text then lists the total of 300 as follows: 120 in the extremities (e.g. hands, legs), 117 in the pelvic area, sides, back, abdomen and breast, and 63 in the neck and upwards. The text then explains how these subtotals were empirically verified. The discussion shows that the Indian tradition nurtured diversity of thought, with Sushruta school reaching its own conclusions and differing from the Atreya-Caraka tradition. The differences in the count of bones in the two schools is partly because Charaka Samhita includes 32 tooth sockets in its count, and their difference of opinions on how and when to count a cartilage as bone (which both sometimes do, unlike modern anatomy).

=== Hellenistic world ===
The study of bones in ancient Greece started under Ptolemaic kings due to their link to Egypt. Herophilos, through his work by studying dissected human corpses in Alexandria, is credited to be the pioneer of the field. His works are lost but are often cited by notable persons in the field such as Galen and Rufus of Ephesus. Galen himself did little dissection though and relied on the work of others like Marinus of Alexandria, as well as his own observations of gladiator cadavers and animals. According to Katherine Park, in medieval Europe dissection continued to be practiced, contrary to the popular understanding that such practices were taboo and thus completely banned. The practice of holy autopsy, such as in the case of Clare of Montefalco further supports the claim. Alexandria continued as a center of anatomy under Islamic rule, with Ibn Zuhr a notable figure. Chinese understandings are divergent, as the closest corresponding concept in the medicinal system seems to be the meridians, although given that Hua Tuo regularly performed surgery, there may be some distance between medical theory and actual understanding.

=== Renaissance ===
Leonardo da Vinci made studies of the skeleton, albeit unpublished in his time. Many artists, Antonio del Pollaiuolo being the first, performed dissections for better understanding of the body, although they concentrated mostly on the muscles. Vesalius, regarded as the founder of modern anatomy, authored the book De humani corporis fabrica, which contained many illustrations of the skeleton and other body parts, correcting some theories dating from Galen, such as the lower jaw being a single bone instead of two. Various other figures like Alessandro Achillini also contributed to the further understanding of the skeleton.

=== 18th century ===
As early as 1797, the death goddess or folk saint known as Santa Muerte has been represented as a skeleton.

== See also ==
- List of bones of the human skeleton
- Distraction osteogenesis
