= Phenice method =

Method to determine the sex of a human skeleton

The Phenice method is a technique of determining the sex of a human skeleton from the innominate pelvis. In the procedure, sex is determined based on three features: the ventral arc, the subpubic concavity, and the medial aspect of the ischiopubic ramus. As a non-metric absolute method, it relies on the recognition of discrete male and female traits. This makes the method objective, easily performable, and relatively quick (although this has been challenged by those seeking to improve the method). It is considered highly accurate, up to 96%, owing to the distinct biological differences between male and female anatomy in the pelvis, making it a highly useful method for those determining the sex of a skeleton.

== Uses ==
Determining the sex of a human skeleton has multiple uses. Within archaeology, it is essential for building a biological profile of an individual, which in turn might be used to make assumptions about sex-based roles and responsibilities or contrast life histories based on sex. It is also important for reconstructing demographics of past societies to estimate population size, family size, and other factors. Within the field of heritage, it may be useful in reconstructing the appearance and life of an individual for public presentation. It also has forensic uses where it can aid in the identification of bodies for legal purposes.

== History of the method ==
While the pelvis has long been recognized as an important piece of skeletal morphology in determining sex, the Phenice method was proposed in 1969 by T. W. Phenice. Before Phenice's ideas, the study of the pubis focused on aspects such as the width of the pubis, the pre-auricular suculus and the greater sciatic notch among others. Phenice considered these aspects highly relative and therefore subject to the researcher. Furthermore, they required experience to identify. Phenice's method was originally based on the differences between the area of attachment of the crus of penis or crus of clitoris to the ischiopubic ramus, however he determined this was not accurate enough and chose to consider the two further aspects as well. Phenice's principles have been tested and revised numerous times since their original publication, most notably by Klales et al. in 2012. This paper claimed that Phenice's original method did not acknowledge the prevalence of intermediate forms between extreme male and female features, nor did it appropriately consider the significance of the different features of the innominate, nor did it calculate the posterior probability as to quantify the likelihood of the individual belonging to the other sex. As such, Klales et al. proposed an improved method that is often used today.

== Determining sex using the method ==
=== Ventral arc ===
Firstly, the innominate must be correctly orientated. The ventral surface must face the observer, the pubic symphysis in the anterior-posterior plane. Phenice describes the ventral arc as ‘a slightly elevated ridge of bone which extends from the pubic crest and arcs inferiorly across the ventral surface to the lateral most extension of the subpubic concavity… where it blends with the medial border of the ischio-pubic ramus.’ Phenice suggests the ventral arc can only be found in females, therefore its presence categorizes the subject as female. While a similar ridge may be found on male examples, this is easily distinguishable because it will take an alternative path. As such, the ventral arc is the most objective indicator of sex.

=== Subpubic concavity ===
The pelvis must be orientated such that the observer is looking at the dorsal aspect of the pubis and ischio-pubic ramus. Phenice describes the subpubic concavity as ‘a lateral recurve which occurs in the ischio-pubic ramus… a short distance below the lower margin of the pubic symphysis.’ This is also only found in female examples. Although some males may show a slight subpubic concavity, this is unpronounced enough that the feature remains effectively diagnostic of sex. The subpubic concavity is a slightly less reliable indicator of sex than the ventral arc.

=== Medial aspect of the ischio-pubic ramus ===
The observer must orientate the hip such that they are directly facing the ischio-pubic ramus. A female hip will have a pronounced ridge on this face while a male hip will have a broad flat surface. This criterion is the least distinct of those that Phenice describes, with the highest similarity in male and female examples. It should only be relied upon in conjunction with the other two features.

=== Klales et al's. improvements ===
This improved method does away with the binary of Phenice's original. Instead, an ordinal system with five grades is provided, allowing for consideration of intermediate forms. This system has values of one to five, rather than female or male to avoid a binary. It also makes use of statistical tests to calculate the posterior possibility of each classification as to quantify the certainty of each observation whether male or female.

== Strengths and limitations ==
=== Accuracy ===
Phenice expressed that his method could correctly sex individuals 96% of the time. Following tests have achieved very similar yet slightly lower accuracy rates. While using Klales et al's. revised method an experienced researcher could achieve 95.5% accuracy while an inexperienced individual could determine sex correctly 77% of the time. Males were more easily identified than females in this study, suggesting a sex bias in identification. The highest accuracy was found when combining only the ventral surface and ischiopubic ramus, though including the medial aspect of the ischio-pubic ramus did lower the sex bias. Furthermore, there was no significant difference between groups of different ancestries. As such, the Phenice method remains a highly accurate and widely applicable test.

=== Limitations ===
The Phenice method has three major limitations. While it is not particularly limited by cost, experience, or time like other methods, it does rely on the preservation of an intact pelvis. It also presumes the absence of any pathology that might disturb normal anatomy. Most notably, as the features it uses to determine sex are secondary sexual characteristics that develop only post-puberty, it cannot be used on children. Klales et al's. attempt to adapt the method for subadults, lowering number of ordinal grades to three, only found significant accuracy (above 75%) from early adolescence (ages 12.6–15.3). Meanwhile, early young children (ages 1–3.5 years) could only be correctly identified 53.9% of the time, little more than random chance.

== In application ==
=== In accuracy tests ===
Since most tests of the Phenice method are carried out on modern samples, there is a concern that it does not hold up when applied to past populations, as such it is sometimes applied to historic collections to test its accuracy. For example, as done with the medieval skeleton collection of the Hospital of St John the Evangelist in Cambridge. The concern is that significant differences in diet, lifestyle, and pathogenic stress among other factors may result in differing anatomy that the Phenice method does not account for. This is not helped by the fact that most studies of the Phenice test are performed on relatively modern collections, rarely pre-18th century, as the sex of the individuals must be known already to test the accuracy of the method. However, a DNA test of individuals from the Hospital of St John the Evangelist has provided this basis. In applying the Phenice method to this population, favourable results were found, suggesting that the method could be 83% accurate even for historical populations.

=== In reconstructing demographies ===
The Phenice method can be used to determine the sex of individuals in cemeteries to help reconstruct the demography of the site. This has been enacted at the Eiden Phase cemetery from the Pearson Complex in Eastern North America. 124 of 311 adults could be sexed using this method. This shows how archaeological examples are rarely well preserved enough to accurately determine the sex of most skeletons. Furthermore, no children could be sexed from this site. However, the morphology of the individuals that were sexed was used to create a diagnostic framework based on humerus, femur and foot measurements that allowed the determination of another 113 individuals. Using this information, combined with other discoveries, some demographic factors could then be estimated. For example, a mean fertility rate of 0.0904, and a mean family size of 3.66. The utility of the Phenice method, recognized as quick, easy and accurate, despite its reliance on preservation of the pelvis, in part allowed the reconstruction of this demography.

=== In studying gender ===
The simple binary presented by determining the sex of individuals using the Phenice method may predispose researchers to focus on the sexual binary to the ignorance of other horizontal and vertical social categories and roles. Original excavations at Durankulak in Bulgaria sexed all the burials they could conclusively using osteology, then used grave goods and burial positions to establish a method of determining the sex of other graves. Males were often buried extended and had axes, females often crouched with jewelry. Analysis of further burial sites then built on this model and the confidence with which further burials were sexed was highly related to how well they conformed to this burial hypothesis. The grave sites which exhibited sexing that appeared to contradict the previously determined burial binary were rated as less conclusive, leading to a self-fulfilling theory.
