= C22H32O4 =

The molecular formula C_{22}H_{32}O_{4} may refer to:

- Iloprost, a drug used to treat blood vessels constriction
- Maresin, a macrophage-derived mediator of inflammation
- Protectin D1, a specialized proresolving mediator
- Resocortol, a synthetic glucocorticoid corticosteroid
