= C12H14N4O3S =

The molecular formula C_{12}H_{14}N_{4}O_{3}S (molar mass: 294.33 g/mol, exact mass: 294.0787 u) may refer to:

- Sulfacytine
- Sulfametomidine
