= C18H17ClN2O2 =

The molecular formula C_{18}H_{17}ClN_{2}O_{2} (molar mass: 328.793 g/mol, exact mass: 328.0979 u) may refer to:

- Girisopam
- Oxazolam
