= Soterenol =

Adrenergic bronchodilator

Clinical data
- Other names: MJ-1992
- Drug class: Adrenergic; Bronchodilator; Antiasthmatic; β-Adrenergic receptor agonist

Identifiers
- IUPAC name: N-[2-hydroxy-5-[1-hydroxy-2-(propan-2-ylamino)ethyl]phenyl]methanesulfonamide
- CAS Number: 13642-52-9 14816-67-2 (hydrochloride)
- PubChem CID: 26162
- ChemSpider: 24373
- UNII: 9364W7589B
- KEGG: C11769
- ChEMBL: ChEMBL30746
- CompTox Dashboard (EPA): DTXSID40864426

Chemical and physical data
- Formula: C_{12}H_{20}N_{2}O_{4}S
- Molar mass: 288.36 g·mol^{−1}
- 3D model (JSmol): Interactive image
- SMILES: CC(C)NCC(C1=CC(=C(C=C1)O)NS(=O)(=O)C)O
- InChI: InChI=1S/C12H20N2O4S/c1-8(2)13-7-12(16)9-4-5-11(15)10(6-9)14-19(3,17)18/h4-6,8,12-16H,7H2,1-3H3; Key:HHRNQOGXBRYCHF-UHFFFAOYSA-N

Soterenol (INN), also known as soterenol hydrochloride (USAN; developmental code name MJ-1992) in the case of the hydrochloride salt, is a drug of the phenethylamine family described as an adrenergic, bronchodilator, and antiasthmatic which was never marketed. It is an analogue of salbutamol and acts as a β-adrenergic receptor agonist. The drug was first developed in 1964 and was first described in the literature by 1967.
