= Zomebazam =

Chemical compound

Identifiers
- IUPAC name: 1,3,8-trimethyl-4-phenylpyrazolo[3,4-b][1,4]diazepine-5,7-dione
- CAS Number: 78466-70-3
- PubChem CID: 132677
- ChemSpider: 117132
- UNII: G563Y6G60K
- CompTox Dashboard (EPA): DTXSID60868481

Chemical and physical data
- Formula: C_{15}H_{16}N_{4}O_{2}
- Molar mass: 284.319 g·mol^{−1}
- 3D model (JSmol): Interactive image
- SMILES: O=C1N(c2c(N(C(=O)C1)C)n(nc2C)C)c3ccccc3
- InChI: InChI=1S/C15H16N4O2/c1-10-14-15(18(3)16-10)17(2)12(20)9-13(21)19(14)11-7-5-4-6-8-11/h4-8H,9H2,1-3H3; Key:BFWACMHTIVUWJS-UHFFFAOYSA-N

Zomebazam produced by Hoechst is a pyrazolodiazepinone derivative drug with anxiolytic properties. It is structurally related to razobazam and zometapine.

== Synthesis ==
The catalytic hydrogenation of N,2,5-trimethyl-4-phenyldiazenylpyrazol-3-amine (Note: CID:136203602) (1) over Raney nickel gives 4-amino-1,3-dimethyl-5-methylaminopyrazole (Note: CID:10219477) (2). Treatment with methyl malonyl chloride (Note: CAS# [37517-81-0]) (3) gives 4-α-ethoxycarbonylacetylamino-1,3-dimethyl-5-methylaminopyrazole (Note: CID:20561101) (4). Base-catalyzed lactamization gives (5). The Goldberg reaction completes the synthesis of zomebazam (6).

Synthesis of zomebazam

== See also ==
- Benzodiazepine
