= Anti-asthmatic agent =

Drug used to treat asthma

- Drug class

Class identifiers
- Synonyms: Anti-asthmatic drug; Anti-asthma drug; Anti-asthmatic drug; Asthma drug; Asthma medication
- Use: Treatment of asthma

Legal status

An anti-asthmatic agent, also known as an anti-asthma drug, refers to a drug that can aid in airway smooth muscle dilation to allow normal breathing during an asthma attack or reduce inflammation on the airway to decrease airway resistance for asthmatic patients, or both. The goal of asthmatic agents is to reduce asthma exacerbation frequencies and related hospital visits.

Anti-asthmatic agents as rescue medications for acute asthma attacks include short-acting β_{2}-adrenergic receptor agonists (SABA), short-acting muscarinic antagonists (SAMA), systemic glucocorticoids, and magnesium sulfate. Anti-asthmatic agents as maintenance medications for asthmatic symptom control include long-acting β_{2}-adrenergic receptor agonists (LABA), inhaled glucocorticoids, long-acting muscarinic antagonists (LAMA), methylxanthines/phosphodiesterase inhibitors, leukotriene receptor antagonists, mast cell stabilizers, and certain types of monoclonal antibodies.

The Global Initiative for Asthma (GINA) is the official guideline on the usage of anti-asthmatic agents. The GINA guideline outlines the class, dosage, and administration of anti-asthmatic agents prescription depending on the severity of asthma symptoms and nature.

== Rescue medications ==
=== Inhaled short-acting β2-adrenergic agonists ===
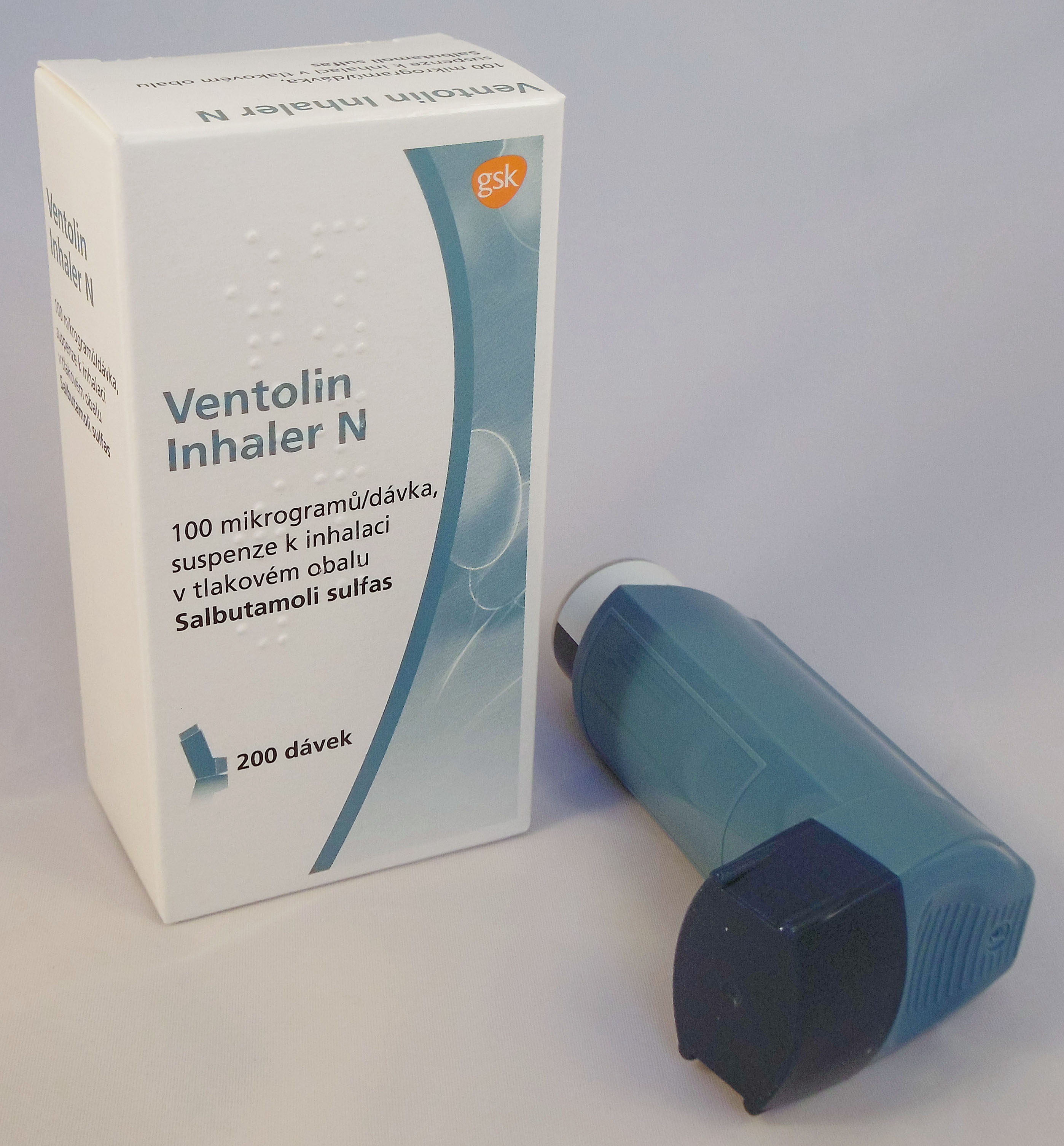
Inhaled short acting β2-adrenergic agonist (Salbutamol metered-dose inhaler)

Inhaled short-acting β2-adrenergic agonists, such as terbutaline and salbutamol, are the first-line drugs indicated for asthma exacerbation for all patients to provide rapid bronchodilating effects. Short-acting β2-adrenergic agonists can be delivered by different devices, for example, nebulizers and metered-dose inhalers.

β2-adrenergic agonists can trigger the activation of Gs protein-coupled β2-adrenergic receptors on the airway smooth muscle cells in the lungs. The β2-adrenergic receptors activation allows the adenylyl cyclase within the airway smooth muscle cells to catalyse the conversion of ATP to cAMP. cAMP as a second messenger further activates protein kinase A and decreases the intracellular calcium level, causing subsequent smooth muscle relaxation.

Common side effects of inhaled β2-adrenergic agonists include tremors, palpitations and headache. The incidence and severity of side effects depend on the dose and route of administration of the β2-adrenergic agonists.

=== Inhaled short-acting muscarinic antagonists ===
Inhaled short-acting muscarinic antagonists, such as oxitropium and ipratropium, can be used as an adjunct therapy with short-acting β2-adrenergic agonists in moderate to severe asthma exacerbations to achieve bronchodilation. Short-acting muscarinic antagonists are usually discontinued upon hospital admission due to a lack of benefits among hospitalized patients.

Muscarinic antagonists can compete with acetylcholine for muscarinic receptors and provide an antagonistic effect on muscarinic receptors, causing inhibition of cholinergic bronchomotor tone and hence bronchodilation.

Inhaled muscarinic antagonists commonly cause dry mouth, throat irritation and dizziness.

=== Systemic glucocorticoids ===
Systemic glucocorticoids, such as oral prednisolone and intravenous hydrocortisone, are indicated for moderate to severe asthma exacerbation to reduce airway inflammation. It is important for patients with refractory asthma exacerbation who are already on intensive bronchodilator therapy as airflow resistance in the airway is likely to be caused by mucus accumulation and inflammation on the airway.

Systemic administration of glucocorticoids can reduce airway mucus production. It can also suppress inflammatory responses by inhibiting the synthesis and release of inflammatory mediators and lowering the infiltration and activity of inflammatory cells. Additionally, glucocorticoids can increase the amount of β2-adrenergic receptors and their sensitivity towards β2-adrenergic agonists on the airway smooth muscles.

The use of systemic glucocorticoids may cause depressed immunity, osteoporosis and Cushing's syndrome. The side effects of glucocorticoids depend on the dose and duration of treatment.

=== Magnesium Sulfate ===
Magnesium sulfate is indicated for severe or life-threatening asthma exacerbation to achieve bronchodilation.

Intravenous magnesium sulfate can reduce calcium ions influx into smooth muscle cells on the airway, causing airway muscle relaxation.

It is possible for intravenous magnesium sulfate to cause hypermagnesemia, resulting in muscle weakness. Intravenous magnesium sulfate is contraindicated in patients with renal insufficiency.

== Maintenance medications ==
=== Long-acting β2-adrenergic agonists ===
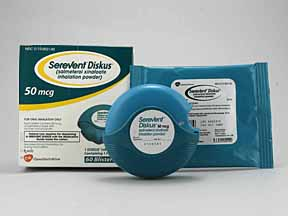
Long-acting β2-adrenergic agonist (Salmeterol)

Long-acting β2-adrenergic agonists, for example, vilanterol, indacaterol, olodaterol, formoterol and salmeterol, are commonly used together with inhaled corticosteroid in maintenance treatment.

=== Inhaled glucocorticoids ===
Inhaled corticosteroids are commonly used together with long-acting β2-adrenergic agonists in maintenance therapy as corticosteroids can increase the amount of airway bronchial β2-receptors and their sensitivity towards β2-selective agents.

The use of inhaled corticosteroid may commonly cause dysphonia and overgrowth of oropharyngeal candidiasis. The risk of overgrowth of oropharyngeal candidiasis can be reduced by rinsing the mouth with water after use.

=== Long-acting muscarinic antagonists ===
Long-acting muscarinic antagonists, including tiotropium, aclidinium and umeclidinium, are indicated for severe asthma in maintenance treatment.

Muscarinic antagonists can reduce cholinergic bronchomotor tone, resulting in airway muscle relexation and bronchodilation.

Muscarinic antagonists commonly cause dry mouth, throat irritation and dizziness.

=== Methylxanthine / Phosphodiesterase Inhibitors ===
Methylxanthines, including theophylline, aminophylline and dyphylline, are a class of drugs that can achieve bronchodilation and reduce bronchospasm for symptomatic control of asthma.

Methylxanthines act as a competitive inhibitor of phosphodiesterase, inhibiting phosphodiesterase degradation action of cyclic 3′,5′-adenosine monophosphate (cAMP). This resulted accumulation of cAMP relaxes smooth muscles, leading to dilation of airways.

Methylxanthines activate histone deacetylases, promoting the deacetylation of histone and subsequent DNA folding. This inhibits the synthesis of pro-inflammatory factors that induce asthma attacks and exacerbations, achieving anti-inflammatory effects.

For asthma maintenance therapy, methylxanthines are taken orally.

Therapeutic drug monitoring is required for patients on methylxanthines as the therapeutic range is narrow. Methylxanthines are not routinely used owing to their adverse effect profiles and the risk of toxicity. Adverse effects of Methylxanthines include nervousness, insomnia, irritability, anxiety, gastrointestinal disturbance (nausea, vomiting), tremor, palpitation and increased urine output.

=== Leukotriene Receptor Antagonists ===
Leukotriene receptor antagonists, including montelukast and zafirlukast, inhibit pro-inflammatory leukotrienes bindings to LTC4 and LTD4 receptors. This blocks the downstream inflammatory pathways that lead to bronchospasm and smooth muscle contractions in asthmatic patients.

Leukotriene receptor antagonists are taken orally.

Common adverse effects of leukotriene receptor antagonists include headache, abdominal pain and diarrhoea.

=== Mast cell stabilizers ===
Mast Cell Stabilizers, including sodium cromoglycate, nedocromil sodium, amlexanox, pemirolast potassium, repirinast and tranilast are drugs that inhibit the degranulation and activation of mast cells upon contact with antigen. This prevents the subsequent release of pro-inflammatory mediators such as histamines and leukotrienes. Mast cell stabilizers are given as prophylactic treatment to prevent exacerbation of asthmatic symptoms.

For asthma maintenance therapy, mast cell stabilizers are taken by inhalation.

Common adverse effects of Mast cell stabilizers include mouth dryness, cough, throat irritation, nasal congestion and bronchospasm.

=== Monoclonal Antibodies ===
Monoclonal Antibodies that aid in asthma symptomatic control include omalizumab, mepolizumab, reslizumab, benralizumab, dupilumab and tezepelumab.

Omalizumab binds to free human immunoglobulin (IgE) to reduce IgE level in circulation. This reduces the subsequent binding of IgE to the IgE receptors on inflammatory cells, including mast cells, basophils and dendritic cells. The release of inflammatory mediators is then prevented.

Mepolizumab and reslizumab inhibit Interleukin (IL)-5 binding with IL-5 receptors on the surface of eosinophils, inhibiting subsequent inflammatory responses.

Benralizumab blocks the IL-5 receptors on basophils, preventing binding of IL-5 with IL-5 receptors on basophils, inhibiting subsequent inflammatory responses.

Dupilumab blocks IL-4 receptors, inhibiting subsequent inflammatory activities of IL-4 and IL-13.

Tezepelumab binds to thymic stromal lymphopoietin (TSLP), which is an inflammatory cytokine in the airway epithelial cells involved in asthma exacerbations, inhibiting subsequent inflammatory responses.

Monoclonal antibodies for the treatment of asthmatic symptoms are given by subcutaneous injections.

Common adverse effects include local site reactions, joint pain, back pain, headache and sore throat.

== Treatment steps ==
=== GINA guideline ===
According to the Global Initiative of Asthma (GINA), the guideline for anti-asthmatic treatment is divided into 5 levels according to asthma severity.

For newly diagnosed asthma patients, the 5 levels derived from the severity of asthma depend on the occurrence of symptoms and their frequencies. These symptoms include bronchoconstriction, shortness of breath and wheezing that exacerbates after physical activities. Frequent coughing, chest tightness and breathing difficulties are also signs of asthma worsening. These symptoms can interfere with a patient's daily living and affect quality of life. These 5 levels are indicators of what drug treatments should be administered. The guideline is as follows:

Step 1-2: Symptoms less than 4–5 days a week

- Low-dose inhaled corticosteroids and formoterol combination therapy when required

Step 3: Symptoms most days, or waking with asthma once a week or more

- Low-dose inhaled corticosteroids and formoterol maintenance therapy

Step 4: Daily symptoms, or waking with asthma once a week or more, and low lung function

- Medium dose inhaled corticosteroids and formoterol maintenance therapy
- Short-course oral corticosteroids when required in severely uncontrolled asthma

Step 5: Further worsening of symptoms and increased occurrence of exacerbations

- Add-on long-acting muscarinic antagonists
- Refer for phenotypic assessment with or without biologic therapy
- Consider high dose inhaled corticosteroids and formoterol maintenance therapy
- Consider Anti-IgE, anti-iL5/5R, anti-IL4Rα or anti-TSLP

==== Reliever: As-needed-only low dose ICS-formoterol ====
The rationale behind using inhaled corticosteroids and formoterol combination therapy as a reliever as opposed to salbutamol, a short-acting β2-adrenergic agonist, is that this dosage regimen shows a reduction in the severe asthma exacerbation risk compared with using β2-adrenergic agonists reliever. As inhaled formoterol medications are often accompanied by a corticosteroid, this combination is a simpler regimen for patients as it uses the same formulation for both reliever and maintenance therapy as well as providing a long duration of bronchodilation effect.
