= Macular telangiectasia =

Disease of the retina affecting central vision

- Macular telangiectasia
- Specialty: Ophthalmology

Macular telangiectasia is a condition of the retina, the light-sensing tissue at the back of the eye that causes gradual deterioration of central vision, interfering with tasks such as reading and driving.

Type 1, a very rare disease involving microaneurysms in the retina, typically affects a single eye in male patients, and it may be associated with Coats' disease.

Type 2 (referred to as MacTel) is the most common macular telangiectasia. It is categorized as "macular perifoveal telangiectasia", a neurodegenerative metabolic disorder, correlated with diabetes and coronary artery disease. It generally affects both eyes and usually affects both sexes equally.

Type 3 is an extremely rare, poorly understood neurological disease of the retina. It is characterized by occlusion and telangiectasia of the capillaries of the fovea in one or both eyes, as well as some exudation.

== Early research ==
Diagram of the human eye showing macula and fovea

Although J. D. Gass originally identified four types of idiopathic juxtafoveolar retinal telangiectasis in 1982, contemporary researchers describe three types collectively known as idiopathic juxtafoveal telangiectasia: macular telangiectasia type 1, macular telangiectasia type 2, and macular telangiectasia type 3.

Both macular telangiectasia and age-related macular degeneration (AMD) lead to photoreceptor atrophy and loss of central vision. The two diseases may be distinguished by symptoms, clinical features, and pathogenesis.

The natural history of macular telangiectasia suggests a slowly progressive disorder. A retrospective series of 20 patients over 10 to 21 years showed deterioration of vision in more than 84% of eyes, either due to intra-retinal edema and serous retinal detachment (Type 1) or retinal pigment epithelium (RPE) scar formation or neovascularization (Type 2).

== Type 1 ==
Cystoid Macular Oedema in patient with MacTel type 1

Type 1 idiopathic macular telangiectasia patients are typically males, 40 years old or older.

=== Pathophysiology ===
Type 1 may be defined as an acquired capillary ectasia (a focal expansion or outpouching) and dilation in the parafoveal region, leading to vascular incompetence. Telangiectatic vessels develop micro-aneurysms that leak fluid, blood, and occasionally, lipid. Macular telangiectasia type 1 has been called as a variant of Coats' disease.

=== Treatment ===
Treatment options for Type 1 include laser photocoagulation, intravitreal injections of steroids, or anti-vascular endothelial growth factor (VEGF) agents. Photocoagulation was recommended by Gass and remains to date the mainstay of treatment. It seems to be successful in causing resolution of exudation and VA improvement or stabilization in selected patients. Photocoagulation should be used sparingly to reduce the chance of producing a symptomatic paracentral scotoma and metamorphopsia. Small burns (100–200 μm) of moderate intensity in a grid-pattern and on multiple occasions, if necessary, are recommended. It is unnecessary to destroy every dilated capillary, and, particularly during the initial session of photocoagulation, those on the edge of the capillary-free zone should be avoided.

Intravitreal injections of triamcinolone acetonide (IVTA) which have proved to be beneficial in the treatment of macular edema by their anti-inflammatory effect, their downregulation of VEGF production, and stabilization of the blood retinal barrier, were reported anecdotally in the management of Macular telangiectasia type 1. In two case reports, IVTA of 4 mg allowed a transitory reduction of retinal edema, with variable or no increase in visual acuity (VA). As expected with all IVTA injections, the edema recurred within 3–6 months, and no permanent improvement could be shown. In general, the effect of IVTA is short-lived and complications, mainly increased intraocular pressure and cataract, limit its use.

Indocyanine green angiography-guided laser photocoagulation directed at the leaky microaneurysms and vessels combined with sub-Tenon's capsule injection of triamcinolone acetonide has also been reported in a limited number of patients with Macular telangiectasia type 1 with improvement or stabilization of vision after a mean follow-up of 10 months. Further studies are needed to assess the efficacy of this treatment modality.

Recently, intravitreal injections of anti-VEGF agents, namely bevacizumab, a humanized monoclonal antibody targeted against pro-angiogenic, circulatory VEGF; and ranibizumab, a FDA-approved monoclonal antibody fragment that targets all VEGF-A isoforms, have shown improved visual outcome and reduced leakage in macular edema from diabetes and retinal venous occlusions. In one reported patient with Macular telangiectasia type 1, a single intravitreal bevacizumab injection resulted in a marked increase in VA from 20/50 to 20/20, with significant and sustained decrease in both leakage on fluorescein angiography (FA) and cystoid macular edema on optical coherence tomography (OCT) up to 12 months. It is likely that patients with Macular telangiectasia type 1 with pronounced macular edema from leaky telangiectasis may benefit functionally and morphologically from intravitreal anti-VEGF injections, but this warrants further studies.

Today, laser photocoagulation remains mostly effective, but the optimal treatment of Macular telangiectasia type 1 is questioned, and larger series comparing different treatment modalities seem warranted. The rarity of the disease, however, makes it difficult to assess in a controlled randomized manner. A 2014 case study of a single type 1 macular telangiectasia patient concluded Bevacizumab was not effective, but Aflibercept produced beneficial results.

== Type 2 (MacTel) ==
Contemporary research has shown that MacTel is likely a neurodegenerative metabolic disease. MacTel is correlated with hypertension and diabetes mellitus.

Although MacTel has been previously regarded as a rare disease, it is in fact probably much more common than previously thought. The subtleness of early symptoms of MacTel may cause mis-diagnosis by optometrists and general ophthalmologists.

MacTel may also be referred to by various names, including (idiopathic) juxtafoveolar telangiectasia, or parafoveal telangiectasis, depending on the source. All refer to the same disease.

=== Signs and symptoms ===
Typical patients present with a mean age of 55–59 years, and a wide range of symptoms from totally asymptomatic to substantially impaired; in most cases however, patients retain functional acuity of 20/200 or better. Metamorphopsia (visual distortions) may be a subjective complaint. Due to the development of paracentral scotoma (blind spots), impaired reading ability may be the first symptom of the disease.

=== Causes ===
In September 2019, researchers announced, "a combination of genetics, metabolism and biochemistry drives a disease such as MacTel".

=== Diagnosis ===
Type 2 MacTel commonly occurs in both eyes, and occurs equally in males and females.

Histopathology studies have shown a loss of Müller glia markers in the clinically altered area.

According to Dr. Paul Ramkisson,

Diagnosis of MacTel type 2 may be aided by the use of advanced imaging techniques such as fluorescein angiography (which may identify an abnormal capillary pattern), fundus autofluorescence, and OCT. These can help to identify the abnormal vessels, pigment plaques, retinal crystals, foveal atrophy and intraretinal cavities associated with this disorder.

Areas of focal RPE hyperplasia (pigment plaques) often develop in the paramacular region as a response to these abnormal vessels. Other signs of macular telangiectasia type 2 include right angle venules, representing an unusual alteration of the vasculature in the paramacular area, with vessels taking an abrupt turn toward the macula as if being dragged.

Fluorescein angiography (FA) is helpful in identifying the anomalous vasculature, particularly in the early stages of Type 2 disease. Formerly, FA was essential in making a definitive diagnosis. However, the diagnosis can be established with less invasive imaging techniques such as Ocular Coherence Tomography (OCT) and fundus autofluorescence. Some clinicians argue that FA testing may be unnecessary when a diagnosis is apparent via less invasive means.

Macular telangiectasia type 2 is commonly under-diagnosed. The findings may appear very similar to diabetic retinopathy, and many cases have been incorrectly ascribed to diabetic retinopathy or age-related macular degeneration. Recognition of this condition can save an affected patient from unnecessarily undergoing extensive medical testing and/or treatment. MacTel should be considered in cases of mild paramacular dot and blot hemorrhages and in cases of macular and paramacular retinal pigment epithelium (RPE) hyperplasia where no other cause can be identified.

=== Treatment ===
The most crucial aspect of treating macular telangiectasia is recognition of the clinical signs. This condition is relatively uncommon: hence, many practitioners may not be familiar with or experienced in diagnosing the disorder. MacTel must be part of the differential in any case of idiopathic paramacular hemorrhage, vasculopathy, macular edema or focal pigment hypertrophy, especially in those patients without a history of retinopathy or contributory systemic disease.

Treatment options are limited. Laser therapy may actually enhance vessel ectasia and promote intraretinal fibrosis in these individuals.

Monthly injections of VEGF inhibitors have not proven to be effective in non-proliferative MacTel type 2. Ranibizumab (Lucentis) or bevacizumab (Avastin) may reduce vascular leakage, but neural atrophy may still occur in treated eyes. In proliferative stages (neovascularisation), treatment with Anti-VEGF can be helpful.

Ciliary neurotrophic factor (CNTF) is believed to have neuroprotective properties and could thus be able to slow down the progression of MacTel type 2. According to the American Academy of Ophthalmology, a novel CNTF implant "is a semipermeable fiber membrane filled with human retinal pigment epithelium cells that secrete ciliary neurotrophic factor". During Phase 2 testing, the implant device was "shown to slow the progression of retinal degeneration compared with participants who received the sham treatment. Based on the positive Phase 2 results, two parallel Phase 3 studies were initiated... enrolling patients in the United States, Australia, and Europe to determine the safety and efficacy... for the treatment of MacTel". In February 2019, the U.S. Food and Drug Administration granted "Fast Track" designation for approval of the device to treat macular telangiectasia type 2.

Revakinagene taroretcel (Encelto) was approved for medical use in the United States in March 2025.

== Type 3 ==
"Idiopathic macular telangiectasia type 3 is a rare, acquired, eye disease characterized by progressive visual loss, due to bilateral juxtafoveolar capillary occlusions, capillary telangiectasia, and minimal exudation. It is associated with systemic or cerebral vascular occlusive disease."

=== Terminology ===
Type 3 macular telangiectasia is also called "occlusive idiopathic juxtafoveolar retinal telangiectasis".
