= Girisopam =

Chemical compound

Clinical data
- ATC code: none

Identifiers
- IUPAC name: 1-(3-chlorophenyl)-7,8-dimethoxy-4-methyl-5H-2,3-benzodiazepine
- CAS Number: 82230-53-3
- PubChem CID: 71257
- ChemSpider: 64387
- UNII: 2LP301A921
- ChEMBL: ChEMBL1915065
- CompTox Dashboard (EPA): DTXSID70231642

Chemical and physical data
- Formula: C_{18}H_{17}ClN_{2}O_{2}
- Molar mass: 328.80 g·mol^{−1}
- 3D model (JSmol): Interactive image
- SMILES: Clc3cccc(C\2=N\N=C(/Cc1c/2cc(OC)c(OC)c1)C)c3
- InChI: InChI=1S/C18H17ClN2O2/c1-11-7-13-9-16(22-2)17(23-3)10-15(13)18(21-20-11)12-5-4-6-14(19)8-12/h4-6,8-10H,7H2,1-3H3; Key:VQYLGVVODFDFNK-UHFFFAOYSA-N

Girisopam (GYKI-51189, EGIS-5810) is a drug which is a 2,3-benzodiazepine derivative related to tofisopam and zometapine. It has a selective anxiolytic action with no sedative, anticonvulsant or muscle relaxant effects.

== See also ==
- Benzodiazepine
