= Rafivirumab =

Monoclonal antibody

Monoclonal antibody
- Type: Whole antibody
- Source: Human
- Target: rabies virus glycoprotein

Clinical data
- ATC code: none

Identifiers
- CAS Number: 944548-37-2
- ChemSpider: none
- UNII: F6G4126BPE

Chemical and physical data
- Formula: C_{6462}H_{9954}N_{1718}O_{2036}S_{46}
- Molar mass: 145761.46 g·mol^{−1}

Rafivirumab (CR57) is a monoclonal antibody for the prophylaxis of rabies.
