= Radretumab =

Monoclonal antibody

Monoclonal antibody
- Type: Whole antibody
- Source: Human
- Target: fibronectin

Clinical data
- ATC code: none

Identifiers
- CAS Number: 1253180-81-2
- ChemSpider: none
- UNII: 6JVA140UB4

Radretumab is an antineoplastic. Philogen, a pharmaceutical company specializing in antibody-drug conjugates, is developing it as a conjugate of Iodine-131 to an antibody which binds to fibronectin extra domain-B for treatment of Hodgkin lymphoma.
