= Revakinagene taroretcel =

Gene therapy medication

Clinical data
- Trade names: Encelto
- Other names: NTC-201-6A, revakinagene taroretcel-lwey
- AHFS/Drugs.com: Monograph
- MedlinePlus: a625063
- License data: US DailyMed: Revakinagene taroretcel
- Routes of administration: Intravitreal implantation
- ATC code: None

Legal status
- Legal status: US: ℞-only

Identifiers
- UNII: Q7V7NYG6GM; J3LVA7RZT2
- KEGG: D13084

Revakinagene taroretcel, sold under the brand name Encelto, is an allogeneic encapsulated cell-based gene therapy used for the treatment of macular telangiectasia type 2. Revakinagene taroretcel is administered into the recipient's eye during a single surgical procedure.

Revakinagene taroretcel works by expressing recombinant human ciliary neurotrophic factor, which is a factor that may promote the survival and maintenance of the macular photoreceptors.

Revakinagene taroretcel was approved for medical use in the United States in March 2025.

== Medical uses ==
Revakinagene taroretcel is indicated for the treatment of adults with idiopathic macular telangiectasia type 2.

Macular telangiectasia type 2 is a rare progressive disease of the macula (portion of the eye that process sharp central vision), leading to degeneration of the photoreceptors which are specialized light-detecting cells in the back of the eye.

== Society and culture ==
=== Legal status ===
Revakinagene taroretcel was approved for medical use in the United States in March 2025.

=== Names ===
Revakinagene taroretcel is the international nonproprietary name and the United States Adopted Name.
