= Rezafungin =

Chemical compound

Clinical data
- Trade names: Rezzayo
- Other names: Biafungin; CD101
- AHFS/Drugs.com: Monograph
- MedlinePlus: a623021
- License data: US DailyMed: Rezafungin
- Routes of administration: Intravenous
- Drug class: Antifungal
- ATC code: J02AX08 (WHO)

Legal status
- Legal status: US: ℞-only; EU: Rx-only

Pharmacokinetic data
- Excretion: Feces

Identifiers
- CAS Number: 1396640-59-7
- PubChem CID: 78318119
- DrugBank: DB16310
- UNII: G013B5478J
- KEGG: D11197
- ChEBI: CHEBI:229680

Chemical and physical data
- Formula: C_{63}H_{85}N_{8}O_{17}^{+}
- Molar mass: 1226.412 g·mol^{−1}

Rezafungin, sold under the brand name Rezzayo (by Melinta Therapeutics), is a medication used for the treatment of invasive candidiasis. It is an echinocandin antifungal that acts as a fungal β-glucan synthase inhibitor.

Rezafungin was approved for medical use in the United States in March 2023, and in the European Union in December 2023.

== Medical uses ==
In the United States, rezafungin is indicated in adults who have limited or no alternative options for the treatment of candidemia and invasive candidiasis.

In the European Union, rezafungin is indicated for the treatment of invasive candidiasis in adults.

Rezafungin, while remaining a hydrophilic compound, exhibits a volume of distribution more than twice that of caspofungin. This pharmacokinetic property has supported its investigation for the treatment of deep-seated Candida infections, including osteomyelitis.

== Society and culture ==
=== Legal status ===
Rezafungin was approved for medical use in the United States in March 2023, The FDA granted the application for rezafungin orphan drug, fast track, and priority review designations.

In October 2023, the Committee for Medicinal Products for Human Use of the European Medicines Agency adopted a positive opinion, recommending the granting of a marketing authorization for the medicinal product Rezzayo, intended for the treatment of invasive candidiasis in adults. The applicant for this medicinal product is Mundipharma GmbH. Rezafungin was approved for medical use in the European Union in December 2023.

=== Brand names ===
Rezafungin is the international nonproprietary name.

Rezafungin is sold under the brand name Rezzayo.
