= Restall =

Restall is a surname. Notable people with the surname include:

- Matthew Restall (born 1964), British and American historian of Latin America and of pop music
- Emma Restall Orr (born 1965), British neo-druid, animist, priest, poet, and author
- Greg Restall (born 1969), Australian philosopher
- Robin L. Restall, (1937-2023) British ornithologist, philatelist, painter, and author
