= Razobazam =

Chemical compound

Identifiers
- IUPAC name: 3,8-dimethyl-4-phenyl-2H-pyrazolo[3,4-b][1,4]diazepine-5,7-dione
- CAS Number: 78466-98-5
- PubChem CID: 71228
- ChemSpider: 64363
- UNII: LZ84VWN0U4
- CompTox Dashboard (EPA): DTXSID20868482

Chemical and physical data
- Formula: C_{14}H_{14}N_{4}O_{2}
- Molar mass: 270.292 g·mol^{−1}
- 3D model (JSmol): Interactive image
- SMILES: CC1=C2C(=NN1)N(C(=O)CC(=O)N2C3=CC=CC=C3)C
- InChI: InChI=1S/C14H14N4O2/c1-9-13-14(16-15-9)17(2)11(19)8-12(20)18(13)10-6-4-3-5-7-10/h3-7H,8H2,1-2H3,(H,15,16); Key:RHZDHINXKVZTEF-UHFFFAOYSA-N

Razobazam (INN) is a drug which is a benzodiazepine derivative. Its mechanism of action appears to be quite different from that of most benzodiazepine drugs, and it produces nootropic effects in animal studies.

== See also ==
- Benzodiazepine
- Zomebazam
