= Rentiapril =

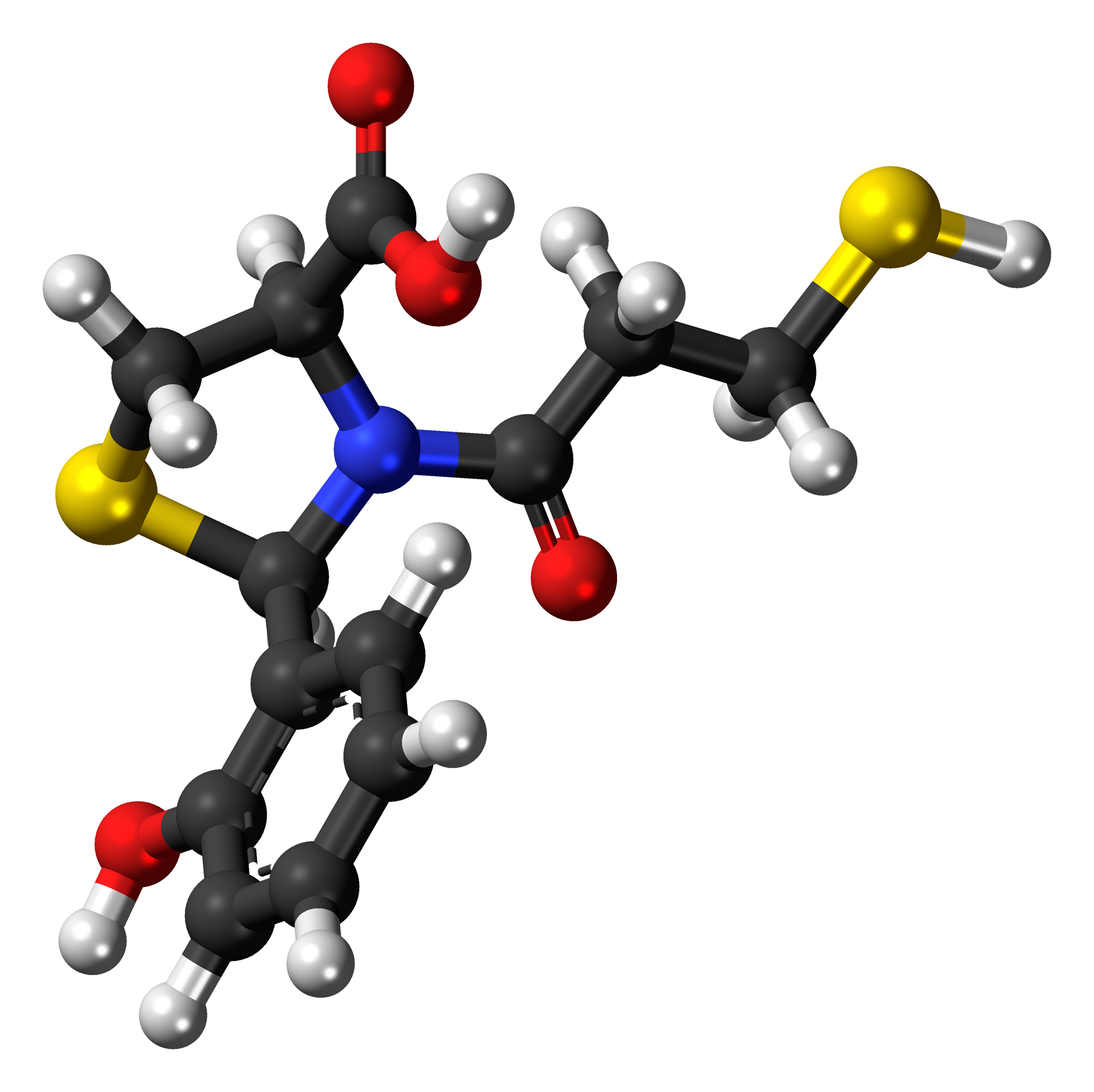

Names
- Systematic IUPAC name (2R,4R)-2-(2-Hydroxyphenyl)-3-(3-sulfanylpropanoyl)-1,3-thiazolidine-4-carboxylic acid

Identifiers
CAS Number	80830-42-8
3D model (JSmol)	Interactive image
ChemSpider	64376
PubChem CID	71244
UNII	D0TAM1017B
CompTox Dashboard (EPA)	DTXSID80230646
- InChI: InChI=1S/C13H15NO4S2/c15-10-4-2-1-3-8(10)12-14(11(16)5-6-19)9(7-20-12)13(17)18/h1-4,9,12,15,19H,5-7H2,(H,17,18)/t9-,12+/m0/s1 Key: BSHDUMDXSRLRBI-JOYOIKCWSA-N; InChI=1/C13H15NO4S2/c15-10-4-2-1-3-8(10)12-14(11(16)5-6-19)9(7-20-12)13(17)18/h1-4,9,12,15,19H,5-7H2,(H,17,18)/t9-,12+/m0/s1 Key: BSHDUMDXSRLRBI-JOYOIKCWBM
- SMILES: C1[C@H](N([C@H](S1)C2=CC=CC=C2O)C(=O)CCS)C(=O)O

Properties
Chemical formula	C_{13}H_{15}NO_{4}S_{2}
Molar mass	313.39 g·mol^{−1}
- Except where otherwise noted, data are given for materials in their standard state (at 25 °C [77 °F], 100 kPa). verify (what is ?) Infobox references

Rentiapril is an ACE inhibitor.
