= Ischiopubic ramus =

Compound structure

- Pelvis. Ischiopubic ramus is the region between "3" and "4c".

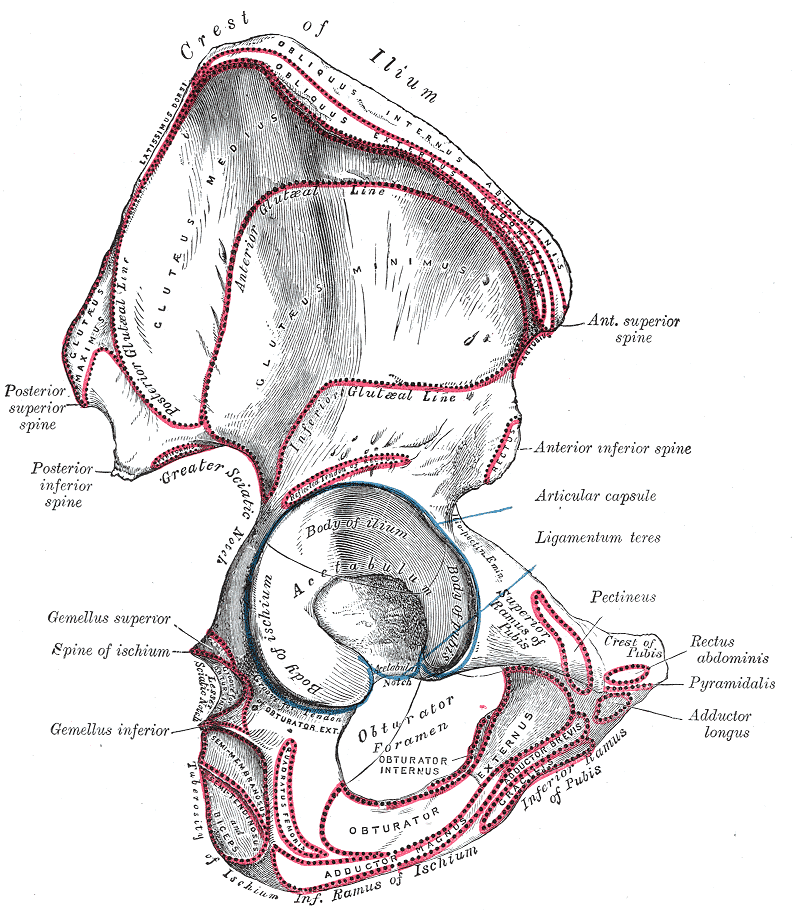
- Right hip bone. External surface.

Details

Identifiers
- Latin: ramus ischiopubicus
- TA98: A02.5.01.007
- TA2: 1313
- FMA: 43533

The ischiopubic ramus is a compound structure consisting of the following two structures:

- from the pubis, the bones inferior pubic ramus
- from the ischium, the inferior ramus of the ischium

It forms the inferior border of the obturator foramen and serves as part of the origin for the obturator internus and externus muscles. Also, most adductors originate at the ischiopubic ramus.

The fascia of Colles is on attached to its margin.
