= Regavirumab =

Monoclonal antibody

Monoclonal antibody
- Type: Whole antibody
- Source: Human
- Target: cytomegalovirus glycoprotein B

Clinical data
- ATC code: none

Identifiers
- CAS Number: 153101-26-9
- ChemSpider: none
- UNII: STG2Q92FWF
- KEGG: D09852

Regavirumab is a human monoclonal antibody against infections with cytomegalovirus.
