= Ranelic acid =

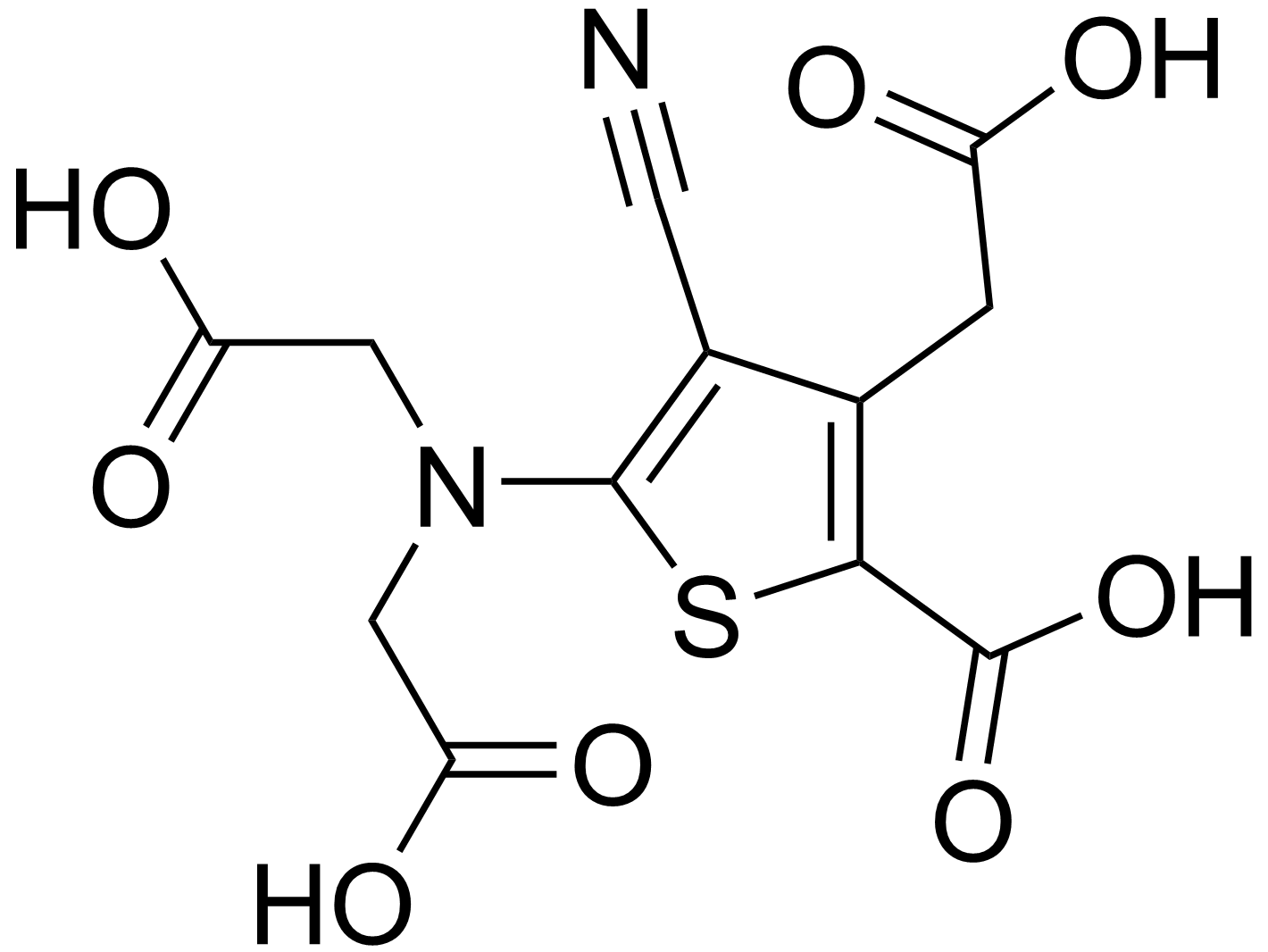
- Structural formula of ranelic acid

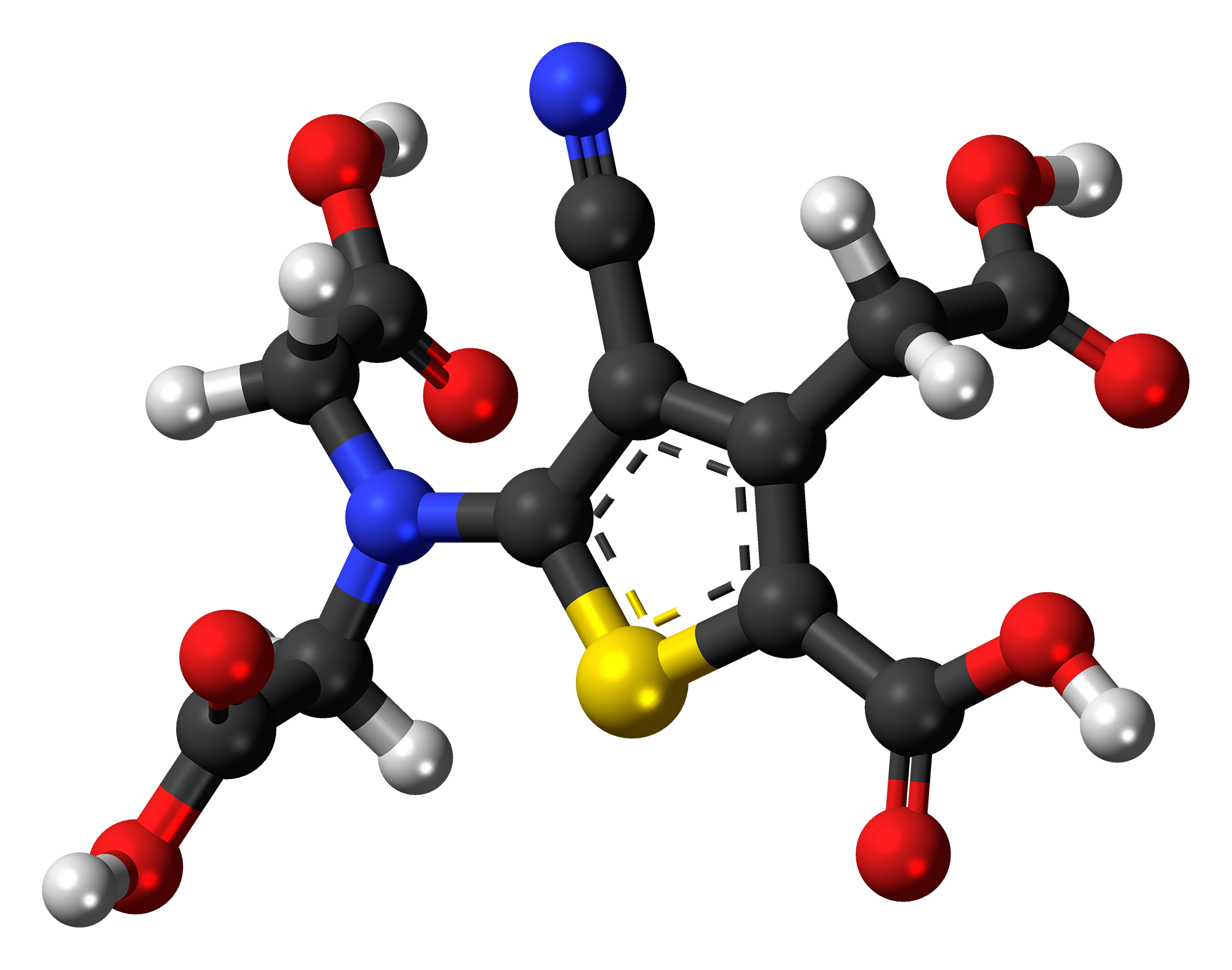

Names
- IUPAC name 3-(Carboxymethyl)-5-[N-(carboxymethyl)glycino]-4-cyanothiophene-2-carboxylic acid
- Systematic IUPAC name 5-[Bis(carboxymethyl)amino]-3-(carboxymethyl)-4-cyanothiophene-2-carboxylic acid

Identifiers
CAS Number	135459-90-4
3D model (JSmol)	Interactive image; Interactive image
ChemSpider	2314551
KEGG	D08467
PubChem CID	3052774
UNII	K9CCS0RIBT
CompTox Dashboard (EPA)	DTXSID3048237
- InChI: InChI=1S/C12H10N2O8S/c13-2-6-5(1-7(15)16)10(12(21)22)23-11(6)14(3-8(17)18)4-9(19)20/h1,3-4H2,(H,15,16)(H,17,18)(H,19,20)(H,21,22) Key: DJSXNILVACEBLP-UHFFFAOYSA-N
- SMILES: OC(=O)CN(CC(O)=O)C1=C(C#N)C(CC(O)=O)=C(S1)C(O)=O; C(C1=C(SC(=C1C#N)N(CC(=O)O)CC(=O)O)C(=O)O)C(=O)O

Properties
Chemical formula	C_{12}H_{10}N_{2}O_{8}S
Molar mass	342.28 g·mol^{−1}
- Except where otherwise noted, data are given for materials in their standard state (at 25 °C [77 °F], 100 kPa). Infobox references

Ranelic acid is an organic acid capable of chelating metal cations.

It forms the ranelate ion, C_{12}H_{6}N_{2}O_{8}S^{4−}. Strontium ranelate, the strontium salt of ranelic acid, is a drug used to treat osteoporosis and increase bone mineral density (BMD).
