= Rebisufligene etisparvovec =

Gene therapy

Clinical data
- Trade names: Fayuvi
- Other names: UX111, ABO-102, rebisufligene etisparvovec-hopf
- AHFS/Drugs.com: Fayuvi
- License data: US DailyMed: Rebisufligene etisparvovec
- Routes of administration: Intravenous infusion
- ATC code: A16AB29 (WHO)

Legal status
- Legal status: US: ℞-only

Identifiers
- CAS Number: 1966978-67-5
- UNII: V28L3Q0LVZ

Rebisufligene etisparvovec, sold under the brand name Fayuvi, is a gene therapy used for the treatment of mucopolysaccharidosis type IIIA (MPS IIIA, Sanfilippo Syndrome Type A). Rebisufligene etisparvovec is an adeno-associated virus (AAV) vector-based gene therapy.

The most common adverse reactions include increases in liver enzymes (AST), nausea and vomiting, fever, decreased appetite, decreased white blood cell and platelet counts, and increased amylase.

Rebisufligene etisparvovec was approved for medical use in the United States in September 2026.

== Medical uses ==
Rebisufligene etisparvovec is indicated for the treatment of neurologic manifestations of mucopolysaccharidosis type IIIA (MPS IIIA, Sanfilippo syndrome type A) in children with preserved neurodevelopmental function.

== Adverse effects ==
The most common adverse reactions include increases in liver enzymes (AST), nausea and vomiting, fever, decreased appetite, decreased white blood cell and platelet counts, and increased amylase.

== History ==
The safety and effectiveness of rebisufligene etisparvovec was evaluated in an open-label, single-arm, multi-center clinical study in children with mucopolysaccharidosis type IIIA. The study measured mean changes in cognitive scores in participants between the ages of 2 and 5 years. Participants treated with rebisufligene etisparvovec maintained or improved cognitive function compared to an untreated historical control cohort — a meaningful divergence from the expected natural disease course of plateau and decline during this critical developmental window. The safety of rebisufligene etisparvovec was evaluated in children who received a single intravenous infusion across clinical studies.

== Society and culture ==
=== Legal status ===
Rebisufligene etisparvovec was approved for medical use in the United States in September 2026. The US Food and Drug Administration (FDA) granted the application for rebisufligene etisparvovec orphan drug, fast track, and breakthrough therapy designations. The FDA granted the approval of Fayuvi to Ultragenyx Pharmaceutical.

=== Names ===
Rebisufligene etisparvovec is the international nonproprietary name.

Rebisufligene etisparvovec is sold under the brand name Fayuvi.
