= Alseroxylon =

Pharmaceutical drug

- Reserpine, the major component of alseroxylon

Clinical data
- ATC code: C02AA03 (WHO)

Identifiers
- CAS Number: 8001-95-4; active moiety: 8063-17-0
- DrugBank: DB00386
- ChemSpider: None
- UNII: H192N84N1G; active moiety: H192N84N1G
- ChEMBL: ChEMBL1201454

Chemical and physical data
- Formula: Varies

Alseroxylon (Rautensin, Rauwiloid) is a norepinephrine reuptake inhibitor that has been investigated in the treatment of hypertension and angina pectoris and as a sedative in psychosis. It was at one time approved for use in the United States, but has since been discontinued.

Alseroxylon is a purified fat-soluble extract of the root of Rauvolfia serpentina, containing reserpine and other nonadrenolytic amorphous alkaloids.
