= Zometapine =

Chemical compound

Identifiers
- IUPAC name: 4-(3-chlorophenyl)-1,3-dimethyl-6,7-dihydro-2H-pyrazolo[3,4-e][1,4]diazepine
- CAS Number: 51022-73-2
- PubChem CID: 5361110
- ChemSpider: 4514671
- UNII: 9171J97IQP
- CompTox Dashboard (EPA): DTXSID30965299

Chemical and physical data
- Formula: C_{14}H_{15}ClN_{4}
- Molar mass: 274.75 g·mol^{−1}
- 3D model (JSmol): Interactive image
- SMILES: Clc3cccc(C/2=N/CC/N=C1/N(N\C(=C1\2)C)C)c3
- InChI: InChI=1S/C14H15ClN4/c1-9-12-13(10-4-3-5-11(15)8-10)16-6-7-17-14(12)19(2)18-9/h3-5,8,18H,6-7H2,1-2H3; Key:CJGOZEVWXQGMCS-UHFFFAOYSA-N

Zometapine (CI-781) is an antidepressant drug which is a pyrazolodiazepine derivative. Its molecular structure closely resembles thienodiazepines and is unrelated to other antidepressant drug classes.

== See also ==
- Zomebazam
