= Sulfacytine =

Chemical compound

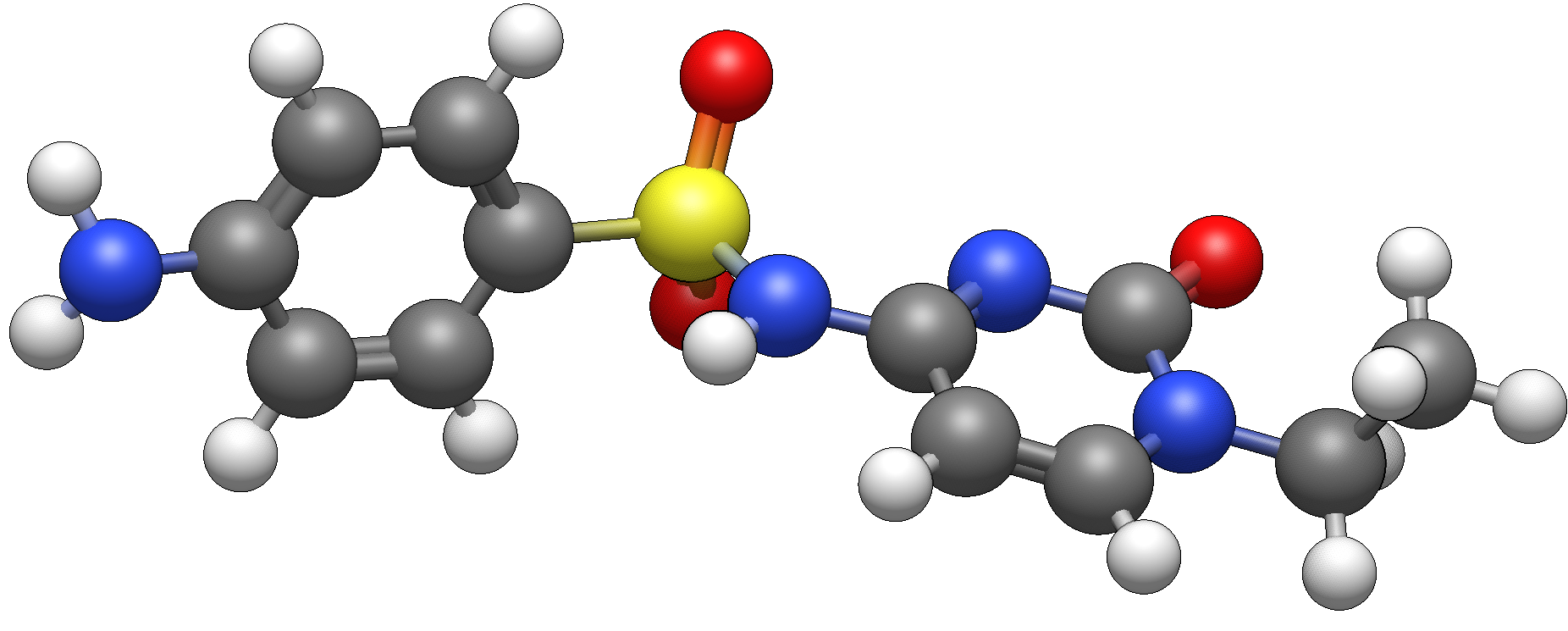

Clinical data
- Other names: 1-Ethyl N4-sulfanilylcytosine; 1-Ethyl-N-sulfanilylcytosine; N-Sulfanilyl-l-ethylcytosine; Sulfacitina [inn-spanish]; Sulfacitinum [inn-latin]
- Routes of administration: Oral

Identifiers
- IUPAC name: 4-Amino-N-(1-ethyl-2-oxo-1,2-dihydropyrimidin-4-yl)benzene-1-sulfonamide
- CAS Number: 17784-12-2
- PubChem CID: 5322
- PubChem SID: 46505483
- DrugBank: DB01298
- ChemSpider: 5131
- UNII: T795873AJP
- ChEMBL: ChEMBL1201056
- CompTox Dashboard (EPA): DTXSID6023606

Chemical and physical data
- Formula: C_{12}H_{14}N_{4}O_{3}S
- Molar mass: 294.33 g·mol^{−1}
- 3D model (JSmol): Interactive image
- SMILES: CCN1C=CC(NS(=O)(=O)C2=CC=C(N)C=C2)=NC1=O
- InChI: InChI=InChI=1S/C12H14N4O3S/c1-2-16-8-7-11(14-12(16)17)15-20(18,19)10-5-3-9(13)4-6-10/h3-8H,2,13H2,1H3,(H,14,15,17); Key:SIBQAECNSSQUOD-UHFFFAOYSA-N

Sulfacytine is a short-acting sulfonamide antibiotic, taken orally for treatment against bacterial infections. Sulfonamides, as a group of antibiotics, work by inhibiting the bacterial synthesis of folate. In 2006, the drug was discontinued.
