= Resocortol =

Chemical compound

Clinical data
- Other names: 11β,17α-Dihydroxy-21-methylpregn-4-ene-3,20-dione
- Drug class: Corticosteroid; Glucocorticoid

Identifiers
- IUPAC name: (8S,9S,10R,11S,13S,14S,17R)-11,17-Dihydroxy-10,13-dimethyl-17-propanoyl-2,6,7,8,9,11,12,14,15,16-decahydro-1H-cyclopenta[a]phenanthren-3-one
- CAS Number: 76675-97-3
- PubChem CID: 20055396
- ChemSpider: 16736760
- UNII: 7351V823E2
- KEGG: D08476
- CompTox Dashboard (EPA): DTXSID801166897

Chemical and physical data
- Formula: C_{22}H_{32}O_{4}
- Molar mass: 360.494 g·mol^{−1}
- 3D model (JSmol): Interactive image
- SMILES: CCC(=O)[C@]1(CC[C@@H]2[C@@]1(C[C@@H]([C@H]3[C@H]2CCC4=CC(=O)CC[C@]34C)O)C)O
- InChI: InChI=1S/C22H32O4/c1-4-18(25)22(26)10-8-16-15-6-5-13-11-14(23)7-9-20(13,2)19(15)17(24)12-21(16,22)3/h11,15-17,19,24,26H,4-10,12H2,1-3H3/t15-,16-,17-,19+,20-,21-,22-/m0/s1; Key:HERCGHIBUWWDIX-CWNVBEKCSA-N

Resocortol is a synthetic glucocorticoid corticosteroid which was never marketed.
