= Repirinast =

Chemical compound

Clinical data
- AHFS/Drugs.com: International Drug Names
- Routes of administration: Oral
- ATC code: none

Legal status
- Legal status: In general: ℞ (Prescription only)

Identifiers
- IUPAC name: 3-methylbutyl 7,8-dimethyl-4,5-dioxo-5,6-dihydro-4H-pyrano[3,2-c]quinoline-2-carboxylate
- CAS Number: 73080-51-0
- PubChem CID: 5050
- ChemSpider: 4874
- UNII: 4K8KA8B61G
- KEGG: D01890
- CompTox Dashboard (EPA): DTXSID10223349

Chemical and physical data
- Formula: C_{20}H_{21}NO_{5}
- Molar mass: 355.390 g·mol^{−1}
- 3D model (JSmol): Interactive image
- SMILES: CC1=C(C2=C(C=C1)C3=C(C(=O)C=C(O3)C(=O)OCCC(C)C)C(=O)N2)C
- InChI: InChI=1S/C20H21NO5/c1-10(2)7-8-25-20(24)15-9-14(22)16-18(26-15)13-6-5-11(3)12(4)17(13)21-19(16)23/h5-6,9-10H,7-8H2,1-4H3,(H,21,23); Key:NFQIAEMCQGTTIR-UHFFFAOYSA-N

Repinirast (INN; marketed under the tradename Romet) is an antihistamine.
