= List of drugs: Do =

This multi-page article lists pharmaceutical drugs alphabetically by name. Many drugs have more than one name and, therefore, the same drug may be listed more than once. Brand names and generic names are differentiated by capitalizing brand names.

See also the list of the top 100 bestselling branded drugs, ranked by sales.

Abbreviations are used in the list as follows:

- INN = International nonproprietary name
- BAN = British Approved Name
- USAN = United States Adopted Name
- Two-letter codes for countries

Lists of drugs
1–9 | A | B | C | D | E | F | G | H | I | J | K | L | M | N | O | P | Q | R | S | T | U | V | W | X | Y | Z

Da–Dd | De | Df–Di | Do | Dr–Dy

== do ==
=== dob-dol ===
- dobupride (INN)
- dobutamine (INN)
- Dobutrex
- DOCA
- docarpamine (INN)
- docebenone (INN)
- docetaxel (INN)
- doconazole (INN)
- doconexent (INN)
- docusate sodium (INN)
- dodeclonium bromide (INN)
- dofamium chloride (INN)
- dofetilide (INN)
- dolasetron (INN)
- Dolene-AP-65
- doliracetam (INN)
- Dolobid
- Dolophine

=== dom-doq ===
- domazoline (INN)
- Domeboro
- domiodol (INN)
- domiphen bromide (INN)
- domipizone (INN)
- domitroban (INN)
- domoprednate (INN)
- domoxin (INN)
- domperidone (INN)
- donanemab-azbt
- donanemab (INN)
- donepezil (INN)
- donetidine (INN)
- donidalorsen (USAN, INN)
- donislecel (USAN)
- Donnatal
- Donnatal "D" tablets
- Donnatal Elixir
- Donnatal Extentabs
- dopamantine (INN)
- dopamine (INN)
- Dopar
- Dope (Cannabis, cocaine, heroin or methamphetamine, depending on region)
- dopexamine (INN)
- Dopram
- dopropidil (INN)
- doqualast (INN)

=== dor-dow ===
- Doral. Redirects to Quazepam.
- doramapimod (USAN)
- doramectin (INN)
- dorastine (INN)
- doravirine (INN)
- doravirine and islatravir
- doreptide (INN)
- doretinel (INN)
- Doribax
- Doriden
- doripenem (USAN)
- dorlimomab aritox (INN)
- dorlixizumab (USAN)
- Dormate
- dornase alfa (INN)
- dorocubicel (USAN, INN)
- Doryx
- Doryx Mpc
- dorzolamide (INN)
- dosergoside (INN)
- dosmalfate (INN)
- Dostinex
- dosulepin (INN)
- Dotarem
- dotarizine (INN)
- dotefonium bromide (INN)
- dovitinib (USAN, INN)
- Dovonex
- Dow-Isoniazid

=== dox ===
- doxacurium chloride (INN)
- doxaminol (INN)
- doxapram (INN)
- doxaprost (INN)
- doxazosin (INN)
- doxefazepam (INN)
- doxenitoin (INN)
- doxepin (INN)
- doxibetasol (INN)
- doxifluridine (INN)
- Doxil
- Doxil (Sequus Pharmaceuticals, Inc.)
- doxofylline (INN)
- doxorubicin (INN)
- doxpicomine (INN)
- Doxy-Sleep-Aid
- Doxy. Redirects to Doxycycline.
- Doxychel
- doxycycline (INN)
- Doxyhexal (Hexal Australia) [Au]. Redirects to doxycycline.
- doxylamine (INN)
