= C21H27FO5 =

The molecular formula C_{21}H_{27}FO_{5} (molar mass: 378.43 g/mol) may refer to:

- Descinolone
- 9α-Fluorocortisone, or alfuorone
- Fluprednisolone
- Isoflupredone
