= C16H14N2O2 =

The molecular formula C_{16}H_{14}N_{2}O_{2} (molar mass: 266.295 g/mol) may refer to:

- Doliracetam
- Methoxyqualone
- Miroprofen
- URB754
