= C9H10FN3O3 =

The molecular formula C_{9}H_{10}FN_{3}O_{3} (molar mass: 227.19 g/mol, exact mass: 227.0706 u) may refer to:

- Dexelvucitabine
- Elvucitabine : Elvucitabine is an antiviral compound with the molecular formula C₉H₁₀FN₃O₃.
