= C26H36N2O3 =

The molecular formula C_{26}H_{36}N_{2}O_{3} (molar mass: 424.576 g/mol) may refer to:

- Devapamil
- Sergolexole (LY-281,067)
