= C6334H9792N1700O2000S42 =

The molecular formula C_{6334}H_{9792}N_{1700}O_{2000}S_{42} (molar mass: 143.1 kg/mol) may refer to:

- Drozitumab
- Enavatuzumab
