= C19H21N3O5 =

The molecular formula C_{19}H_{21}N_{3}O_{5} (molar mass: 371.38 g/mol) may refer to:

- Darodipine, a calcium channel blocker
- Isradipine, a calcium channel blocker
