= C10H17N3S =

The molecular formula C_{10}H_{17}N_{3}S (molar mass: 211.33 g/mol, exact mass: 211.1143 u) may refer to:

- Dexpramipexole, or KNS-760704
- Pramipexole (Mirapex)
