= Amyotrophic lateral sclerosis research =

Medical research on ALS

Research on amyotrophic lateral sclerosis (ALS) has focused on animal models of the disease, its mechanisms, ways to diagnose and track it, and treatments.

== Disease models ==
Many models have been used by researchers in labs to study the disease pathways, mechanisms, and symptoms on simple organisms.

=== In vitro ===
In this strategy the disease is introduced to cell cultures in petri dishes. In this case, motor cells can be grown, and the gene expression is controlled. CRISPR/Cas9 technique can be used to knock-out/in genes that are related to ALS, and it is very beneficial in increasing the expression of the genes to mimic the human model of ALS for a faster onset of the disease. This type of model can be beneficial in high-throughput screening for drug candidates for ALS.

Familial ALS is the most studied; however, a new technique that was recently introduced is the use of induced pluripotent stem cells (iPSC). In this study the researcher can isolate skin fibroblast from a patient with familial or sporadic ALS and reprogram them into motor neuron to study ALS. The main advantage of iPSC is that it allowed researchers to study and understand sALS, and it shows a remarkable contribution in cell-based therapy and drug screening. A recent example had used iPSC of patient with SOD1 dominant mutation and they studied the motor neurons derived from the patient, and they found that the functional genes and the ER stress regulating genes of the mitochondria were reduced in SOD1 patients, similar to the effect of C9orf72 mutation on the patients. In addition, some studies showed that iPSC is better than other types of stem cells due to its ability in differentiating into a mature neuron cell, and many other cells too. These iPSC derived cells can be used in transplant cell therapy, in which they can introduce the differentiated cells into the ALS patient to reduce the symptoms without harming the patient.

=== In vivo ===
Many animals have been used over the years to study ALS and to search for a potential therapy. The animal models can be C. elegans which has only 959 cells with simple structure, and known gene code. Also, some studied have introduced the transgenic strain of C. elegans, which has a mutation in a gene related to ALS for example, and crossed them with the transgenic nlp-29 GFP reporter strain, resulting in fluorescent markers to the cells that are expressing these mutated genes, which can be used to monitor the disease development and effects. Similar, but more complex nervous system from the C. elegans is the Drosophila. Fruit fly ALS models can be used to study the locomotion and eye changes that can be related to human symptoms. Thus, drugs can be tested on these transgenic fruit flies to discovery new target molecules. On the other hand, zebrafish models have been used widely due to their similarity in the development and anatomy characteristics as a vertebrate to the human body. A study introduced the SOD1/GFP transgenic zebra-fish to study that specific gene on the development and occurrence of ALS in the fish, and how can that be used in testing potential therapeutic molecules. All the previous models are considered simple, and save time and money due to their short lifespan and small and simple body structure.

The most studied model for ALS is the rodent, mouse model, which provide the most complex representation of nervous system that is considered the closest in mimicking human nervous system. In this model, the phenotype, and genotype characteristics can be studied and controlled. Many researchers have used transgenic mouse models to study ALS, and one example is the expressing of C9orf72 mutation that can be introduced in mouse using the BAC C9orf72 gene with the multiple repeats of GGGGCC. In that study they chose the bacterial artificial chromosome that has the human length of C9orf72 gene, and they introduced multiple repeats for faster onset of ALS. Also, they have selected for the most stable clone using different conditions, and concluded that the 40 and 500 repeats in the low temperature condition was the most efficient in retaining expansion mutations. Using different BAC C9orf72 transgenic mouse model, they were able to study the symptoms of ALS, such as gait abnormalities, anxiety-like behavior, reduced grip strength, and even death rates. Also, the denervation of motor neurons and dysfunction of neurons can be visualized using fluorescent markers to study the neurodegenerative disorder progression in ALS. Another study also used the SOD1 mutation transgenic mice where they have shown similar signs of ALS that included the axonal and mitochondrial dysfunction and denervation of motor neurons and the reduction of the overall number of neurons in the limbs of the mouse. The TDP-43 transgenic mouse model was also used for ALS studies and it shows similar results to the SOD1 expression, which includes the axon denervation phenotype. For this model which depends on the promoters, they have made many other transgenic mouse models that uses different promoter to compare their phenotype and progression of TDP-43 ALS. Rat models, on the other hand is not very widely used, but their large size can be beneficial in intrathecal injection or mini pump insertion is needed in pharmacological trials. In fact, studied showed that using SOD1 transgenic rat models showed similar development of the genetic and phenotypic traits of the ALS disease.

=== In silico ===
Since the early 2000s, computational approaches involving the application of computational statistics and machine learning techniques to data of patients diagnosed with ALS have been employed by researchers worldwide. For example, crowd-sourcing DREAM challenge about computational approaches for ALS electronic health records' data has been carried out in 2017.

== Potential treatments ==
=== Past clinical trials ===
From the 1960s until 2014, about 50 drugs for ALS were tested in randomized controlled trials (RCTs); of these, riluzole was the only one that showed a slight benefit in improving survival. Drugs not shown to be effective in clinical trials in humans include antiviral drugs (transfer factor, tilorone, indinavir, and amantadine); anti-excitotoxic drugs (branched-chain amino acids, threonine, lamotrigine, gabapentin, nimodipine, dextromethorphan, topiramate, memantine, talampanel, and ceftriaxone), growth factors (acetylcholinesterase inhibitors, octacosanol, gangliosides, thyrotropin-releasing hormone, growth hormone, and erythropoietin); neurotrophic factors (ciliary neurotrophic factor, insulin-like growth factor 1, brain-derived neurotrophic factor, glial cell line-derived neurotrophic factor, xaliproden, and granulocyte colony-stimulating factor), anti-inflammatory drugs (plasma exchange, cyclosporine, cyclophosphamide, total lymphoid irradiation, glatiramer acetate, celecoxib, minocycline, and NP001); antioxidants (acetylcysteine, glutathione, selegiline, vitamin E, and coenzyme Q); anti-apoptotic drugs (pentoxyfilline, omigapil, and minocycline); and drugs to improve mitochondria function (creatine, acetyl-L-carnitine, dexpramipexole, and olesoxime). Other drugs with a variety of mechanisms were tested in clinical trials and not shown to be effective, including phenylbutyrate, valproic acid, lithium carbonate, pioglitazone, Ono-2506 (arundic acid), and arimoclomol.

Repetitive transcranial magnetic stimulation had been studied in amyotrophic lateral sclerosis in small and poorly designed clinical trials; as of 2013, there was insufficient evidence to know whether rTMS is safe or effective for ALS.

One 2016 review of stem cell therapy trials found tentative evidence that intraspinal stem cell implantation was relatively safe and possibly effective. A 2019 Cochrane review of cell based therapies found that there was insufficient evidence to speculate about efficacy. Stem cell therapy can provide additional proteins and enzymes that have shown to help prolong survival and control the symptoms associated with ALS. Those proteins include neurotrophic factors and insulin-like growth factor 1. Both those proteins are still under clinical trials and need to be further studied to evaluate their efficiency and associated side effects.

Masitinib has been approved as an orphan medication in Europe and the United States with studies ongoing as of 2016. Medications tested but without evidence for efficacy include lamotrigine, dextromethorphan, gabapentin, BCAAs, vitamin E, acetylcysteine, selegiline, amantadine, cyclophosphamide, various neurotrophic factors, which has shown promise in both in-vitro and in-vivo models of ALS but is yet to be effective in human models of ALS and creatine. Beta-adrenergic agonist drugs have been proposed as a treatment for their effects on muscle growth and neuroprotection, but there is insufficient research in humans to determine their efficacy.

Techniques to deliver drugs and medications in a better manner are also being investigated and those include altering and developing drugs with specific characteristics, such as size and charge, to allow for their passage through the blood-brain barrier. Furthermore, specific antisense oligonucleotides are being developed that may slow down the progression of ALS and reduce toxicity. Antisense oligonucleotides target specific sequences associated with the C9ORF72 gene that has been identified as a cause for ALS. Another delivery technique being investigated is through adeno-associated viruses that have the ability to deliver drugs and other proteins and genetic components to the central nervous system and aid in protecting neurons from damage caused by ALS.
