= C12H12N2O3 =

The molecular formula C_{12}H_{12}N_{2}O_{3} (molar mass: 232.23 g/mol, exact mass: 232.0848 u) may refer to:

- Dazoxiben, an antithrombotic agent
- Nalidixic acid, the first of the synthetic quinolone antibiotics
- Phenobarbital, a barbiturate
