= C12H18N4O4 =

The molecular formula C_{12}H_{18}N_{4}O_{4} (molar mass: 282.30 g/mol, exact mass: 282.1328 u) may refer to:

- Dupracetam
- ICRF 193
