= C12H18N2O2 =

The molecular formula C_{12}H_{18}N_{2}O_{2} may refer to:

- Doxpicomine
- Isophorone diisocyanate
- Mexacarbate
- Miotine
