= C17H18N2 =

The molecular formula C_{17}H_{18}N_{2} (molar mass: 250.34 g/mol, exact mass: 250.1470 u) may refer to:

- Amfetaminil
- Dazepinil
- Tröger's base
- N-Benzyltryptamine
