= C26H36O5 =

The molecular formula C_{26}H_{36}O_{5} (molar mass: 428.56 g/mol, exact mass: 428.2563 u) may refer to:

- Acetomepregenol (ACM), also called mepregenol diacetate
- Dicirenone
- Domoprednate
