= C16H19BrN2 =

The molecular formula C_{16}H_{19}BrN_{2} (molar mass: 319.24 g/mol, exact mass: 318.0732 u) may refer to:

- Brompheniramine
- Dexbrompheniramine
