= Catheter lock solution =

Catheter lock solution is a solution put into catheters to fill the catheter when not in use, primarily to prevent clotting. Neutrolin is an anti-microbial catheter lock solution developed by Cormedix/Cormedix GmbH. Neutrolin contains heparin and citrate (1000 U/mL and 3.5% respectively), two compounds commonly used to prevent thrombosis and maintain catheter patency. Other brand names include Citra-Lock and Taurolock.

Neutrolin also contains taurolidine, an anti-microbial agent that has been shown to be safe and effective in preventing bacterial colonization of catheters. No resistance to taurolidine has been observed to date.

To avoid the use of heparin in central venous catheters, citrate catheter locks were developed. Citrate solutions can be used as a catheter lock without any additives like antibiotic agents or antiseptic agents like taurolidine. Antibiotic catheter lock solutions could lead to antibiotic resistance and taurolidine has been associated with catheter-related clotting. Therefore it is necessary to mix taurolidine products with heparin to avoid catheter patency issues like thrombosis. Heparin is an anticoagulant, and if used as a catheter lock solution it could leak into the blood circulation of the patient. Therefore it has been associated with catheter-related bleeding and heparin induced thrombocytopenia (HIT).

Citrate catheter lock solutions are being used in three different concentrations – 4%, 30% and 46.7%. Citrate catheter lock solutions of 4% concentration have been recommended as best practice in a position statement of European Renal Best Practice guidelines, as published in 2010.

The concentrations of 30% citrate and 46.7% citrate used as catheter lock solution have been associated with lower rates of catheter related infection and a decrease of the use of thrombolytic agents like urokinase or tissue plasminogen activator (t-PA).

Taurolidine/heparin (Defencath) was approved for medical use in the United States in November 2023.
