= Taurolidine/heparin =

Medication

Combination of
- Taurolidine: Thiadiazinane antimicrobial
- Heparin: Anti-coagulant

Clinical data
- Trade names: Defencath
- AHFS/Drugs.com: Defencath
- License data: US DailyMed: Taurolidine and heparin
- Routes of administration: Intraluminal
- ATC code: None

Legal status
- Legal status: US: ℞-only

Identifiers
- KEGG: D12737

Taurolidine/heparin, sold under the brand name Defencath, is a fixed-dose combination catheter lock solution used for central venous catheter instillation. It contains taurolidine, a thiadiazinane antimicrobial; and heparin, an anti-coagulant. Its use is limited to people with kidney failure receiving chronic hemodialysis through a central venous catheter.

The most frequently reported adverse reactions include hemodialysis catheter malfunction, hemorrhage/bleeding, nausea, vomiting, dizziness, musculoskeletal chest pain, and thrombocytopenia.

Taurolidine/heparin was approved for medical use in the United States in November 2023. The US Food and Drug Administration (FDA) considers it to be a first-in-class medication.

== Medical uses ==
Taurolidine/heparin is indicated to reduce catheter-related bloodstream infections in adults with kidney failure who are receiving chronic hemodialysis through a central venous catheter. It is indicated in this limited and specific patient population.

== History ==
Taurolidine/heparin was studied in a single, randomized, active-controlled phase III clinical trial. In this trial, taurolidine/heparin delayed the time it took to acquire a catheter related bloodstream infection. Taurolidine/heparin demonstrated a 71% risk reduction in catheter related bloodstream infections versus the heparin comparator arm (95% confidence interval for risk reduction: 38% to 86%; p value = 0.0006).
