= Olaflur =

Chemical compound

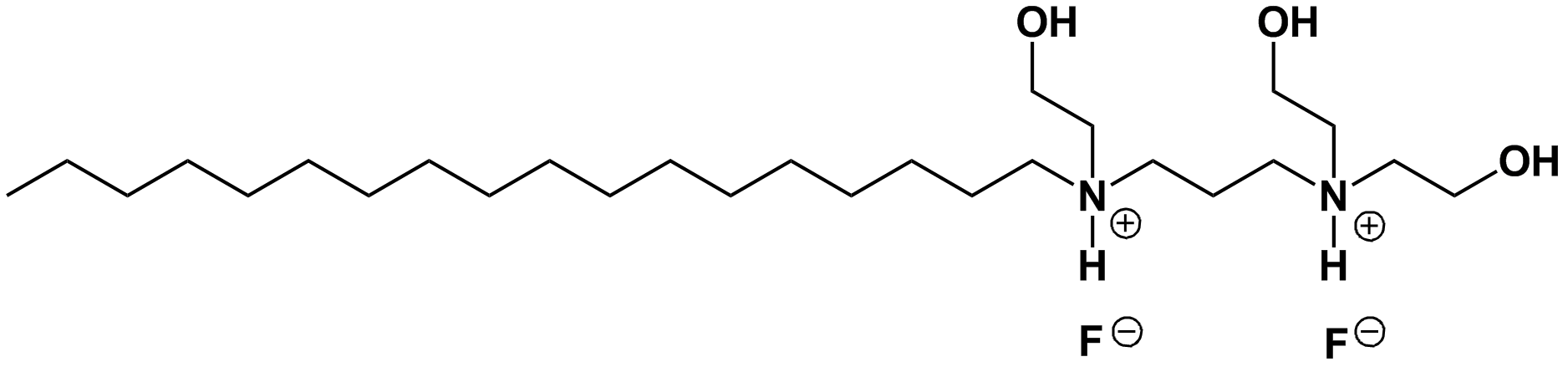

Clinical data
- Other names: {3-[Octadecyl(2-hydroxyethyl)aminio]propyl}bis(2-hydroxyethyl)amine dihydrofluoride
- AHFS/Drugs.com: International Drug Names
- Pregnancy category: No adequate studies
- Routes of administration: Topical (toothpaste, mouthwash, gel)
- ATC code: A01AA03 (WHO)

Legal status
- Legal status: In general: Over-the-counter (OTC)

Identifiers
- IUPAC name: N,N,N'-tris(2-hydroxyethyl)-N'-octadecylpropane-1,3-diamine dihydrofluoride
- CAS Number: 6818-37-7
- PubChem CID: 23257
- ChemSpider: 21751
- UNII: 8NY9L8837D
- CompTox Dashboard (EPA): DTXSID40987684
- ECHA InfoCard: 100.027.174

Chemical and physical data
- Formula: C_{27}H_{60}F_{2}N_{2}O_{3}
- Molar mass: 498.785 g·mol^{−1}
- 3D model (JSmol): Interactive image
- SMILES: F.F.OCCN(CCCN(CCCCCCCCCCCCCCCCCC)CCO)CCO
- InChI: InChI=1S/C27H58N2O3.2FH/c1-2-3-4-5-6-7-8-9-10-11-12-13-14-15-16-17-19-28(22-25-30)20-18-21-29(23-26-31)24-27-32;;/h30-32H,2-27H2,1H3;2*1H; Key:ZVVSSOQAYNYNPP-UHFFFAOYSA-N

Olaflur (INN, or amine fluoride 297) is a fluoride-containing substance that is an ingredient of toothpastes and solutions for the prevention of dental caries. It has been in use since 1966. Especially in combination with dectaflur, it is also used in the form of gels for the treatment of early stages of caries, sensitive teeth, and by dentists for the refluoridation of damaged tooth enamel.

== Overdosage ==
Overdosage leads to irritation of the oral mucosa. In especially sensitive persons, even standard doses of olaflur can cause irritation. Like other fluoride salts, olaflur is toxic when given in high doses over an extended period of time. Especially in children, before the development of the permanent teeth, overdosage can lead to dental fluorosis, a discolouring and weakening of the enamel. In acute cases of overdosage, for example when an olaflur containing preparation is swallowed, calcium in any oral form serves as an antidote. Often milk is used because it is usually at hand.

== Interactions ==
Because calcium fluoride is practically insoluble in water, calcium-containing drugs and food inhibit the action of olaflur.

== Chemistry and mechanism of action ==
Olaflur is a salt consisting of an alkyl ammonium cation and fluoride as the counterion. With a long lipophilic hydrocarbon chain, the cation has surfactant properties. It forms a film layer on the surface of teeth, which facilitates incorporation of fluoride into the enamel. The top layers of the enamel's primary mineral, hydroxylapatite, are converted into the more robust fluorapatite. The fluoridation reaches only a depth of a few nanometres, which has raised doubts whether the mechanism really relies on the formation of fluorapatite.

=== Synthesis ===
The synthesis of olaflur starts from cattle's tallow. The contained fatty acids, mainly stearic acid (C_{17}H_{35}COOH), are obtained by hydrolysis, and then converted to the corresponding amides, which in turn are reduced catalytically to the primary amines (largely octadecylamine). Addition of acrylonitrile, followed by another reduction, yields N-alkyl-1,3-propanediamines. The two nitrogen atoms react with ethylene oxide to form tertiary amines. Finally, hydrofluoric acid is added to give the end product. Because olaflur is produced from a mixture of fatty acids, some molecules have side chains that are longer or shorter than 18 carbon atoms. Other byproducts of the reaction include hydroxyethyl ethers resulting from addition of ethylene oxide to the free hydroxyl groups. The presence of these side products is clinically irrelevant.

== See also ==
- Fluoride therapy
- Remineralisation of teeth
