= Enavatuzumab =

Monoclonal antibody

Monoclonal antibody
- Type: Whole antibody
- Source: Humanized (from mouse)
- Target: TWEAK receptor

Clinical data
- ATC code: none

Identifiers
- CAS Number: 1062149-33-0
- ChemSpider: none
- UNII: 914910XFBB
- KEGG: D09896

Chemical and physical data
- Formula: C_{6334}H_{9792}N_{1700}O_{2000}S_{42}
- Molar mass: 143104.43 g·mol^{−1}

Enavatuzumab is a humanized monoclonal antibody used in the treatment of solid tumors. It targets the TWEAK receptor.

Enavatuzumab was developed by Facet Biotech Corp.
