= Allogeneic umbilical cord-derived CD34- cells, non-expanded/dorocubicel =

Medication

Combination of
- Allogeneic umbilical cord-derived CD34- cells, non-expanded: Stem cells
- Dorocubicel: Stem cells

Clinical data
- Other names: UM171 Cell Therapy
- Routes of administration: Intravenous
- ATC code: B05AX04 (WHO)

Legal status
- Legal status: EU: Rx-only

Identifiers
- KEGG: D13157

Allogeneic umbilical cord-derived CD34- cells, non-expanded/dorocubicel is a cancer treatment for use in hematopoietic stem cell transplantation. It is composed of two distinct cellular components both derived from umbilical cord blood.

It was authorized for medical use in the European Union in August 2025.

The first component is dorocubicel, which consists of CD34+ hematopoietic stem cells that have been expanded ex vivo in cell culture using the small molecule UM171. UM171 is a pyrimido-indole derivative shown to enhance the self-renewal capacity and proliferative potential of hematopoietic stem cells while preserving their undifferentiated state, or multipotency. Expansion of CD34+ cells aims to accelerate engraftment and improve immune system reconstitution following transplantation.

The second component consists of non-expanded CD34− cells, which are a heterogeneous population of umbilical cord blood-derived cells that may include supportive stromal or immune-modulating cell types. These cells are not manipulated in culture prior to administration and are believed to contribute to the overall graft function and engraftment process through paracrine signaling.

== Society and culture ==
=== Legal status ===
In June 2025, the Committee for Medicinal Products for Human Use of the European Medicines Agency adopted a positive opinion, recommending the granting of a conditional marketing authorization for the medicinal product Zemcelpro, intended for the treatment of adults with hematological malignancies requiring an allogeneic hematopoietic stem cell transplantation for whom no other type of suitable donor cells is available. Zemcelpro was authorized for medical use in the European Union in August 2025.
