= Elvucitabine =

Medication

Clinical data
- ATC code: none

Identifiers
- IUPAC name: 4-Amino-5-fluoro-1-[(2S,5R)-5-(hydroxymethyl)-2,5-dihydrofuran-2-yl]pyrimidin-2-one
- CAS Number: 181785-84-2
- PubChem CID: 469717
- ChemSpider: 412628
- UNII: M09BUF90C0
- ChEMBL: ChEMBL38700
- NIAID ChemDB: 060327
- CompTox Dashboard (EPA): DTXSID20171185

Chemical and physical data
- Formula: C_{9}H_{10}FN_{3}O_{3}
- Molar mass: 227.195 g·mol^{−1}
- 3D model (JSmol): Interactive image
- SMILES: c1c(c(nc(=O)n1[C@@H]2C=C[C@@H](O2)CO)N)F
- InChI: InChI=1S/C9H10FN3O3/c10-6-3-13(9(15)12-8(6)11)7-2-1-5(4-14)16-7/h1-3,5,7,14H,4H2,(H2,11,12,15)/t5-,7+/m1/s1; Key:HSBKFSPNDWWPSL-VDTYLAMSSA-N

Elvucitabine is an experimental drug being developed by Achillion Pharmaceuticals for the treatment of HIV infection. Elvucitabine belongs to a class of HIV drugs called nucleoside reverse transcriptase inhibitors (NRTIs). By blocking reverse transcriptase enzymes, NRTIs prevent HIV from multiplying and can reduce the amount of HIV in the body.

Elvucitabine is similar in chemical structure to the FDA-approved NRTIs lamivudine (Epivir) and emtricitabine (Emtriva). However, in vitro studies have suggested that elvucitabine may affect certain HIV strains resistant to these other NRTIs. Studies have also suggested that elvucitabine may be effective against hepatitis B virus (HBV).

As of 2008, elvucitabine was in Phase II clinical trials.
