= Dacemazine =

Chemical compound

Clinical data
- ATC code: none

Identifiers
- IUPAC name: 2-dimethylamino-1-phenothiazin-10-ylethanone
- CAS Number: 518-61-6
- PubChem CID: 68846
- ChemSpider: 62079
- UNII: 88D34UY0QI
- ChEMBL: ChEMBL2107547
- CompTox Dashboard (EPA): DTXSID70199733

Chemical and physical data
- Formula: C_{16}H_{16}N_{2}OS
- Molar mass: 284.38 g·mol^{−1}
- 3D model (JSmol): Interactive image
- SMILES: O=C(N1c3c(Sc2c1cccc2)cccc3)CN(C)C
- InChI: InChI=1S/C16H16N2OS/c1-17(2)11-16(19)18-12-7-3-5-9-14(12)20-15-10-6-4-8-13(15)18/h3-10H,11H2,1-2H3; Key:HKUCYAHWPVLPFN-UHFFFAOYSA-N

Dacemazine (INN, also known as Ahistan and Histantine) is a phenothiazine derivative which acts as a histamine antagonist at the H_{1} subtype. First described in 1951, it was never marketed as a drug on its own, although a combination of dacemazine and di-tert-butylnaphthalenesulfonate was sold as an antispasmodic and antitussive under the trade name Codopectyl. It was also assessed as a possible anticancer drug.

== Synthesis ==
Synthesis: Patent (Example 8):

Amide formation between phenothiazine (1) and chloroacetyl chloride (2) gives 10-(chloroacetyl)-phenothiazine (3). The subsequent displacement of the remaining halogen with dimethylamine (4) completes the synthesis of dacemazine (5).
