= Droxinavir =

Names
- IUPAC name 3-tert-butyl-1-[(2R,3S)-3-[(2S)-3,3-dimethyl-2-[2-(methylamino)acetamido]butyramido]-2-hydroxy-4-phenylbutyl-1-isopentylurea
- Other names SC 55389A

Identifiers
| CAS Number | 159910-86-8 |
| 3D model (JSmol) | Interactive image |
| ChEMBL | ChEMBL2110878 |
| ChemSpider | 409165 |
| PubChem CID | 70683043 |
| UNII | 3CF21QCB9J |
| CompTox Dashboard (EPA) | DTXSID30166769 |
- InChI: InChI=1S/C29H51N5O4/c1-19(2)15-22(26(37)34-29(6,7)8)31-17-23(35)21(16-20-13-11-10-12-14-20)32-27(38)25(28(3,4)5)33-24(36)18-30-9/h10-14,19,21-23,25,30-31,35H,15-18H2,1-9H3,(H,32,38)(H,33,36)(H,34,37)/t21-,22?,23+,25+/m0/s1 Key: PLQLXAKSONXQOQ-XCZUPJPTSA-N
- SMILES: CC(C)CC(C(=O)NC(C)(C)C)NCC(C(CC1=CC=CC=C1)NC(=O)C(C(C)(C)C)NC(=O)CNC)O

Properties
| Chemical formula | C_{29}H_{51}N_{5}O_{4} |
| Molar mass | 533.75 g·mol^{−1} |
- Except where otherwise noted, data are given for materials in their standard state (at 25 °C [77 °F], 100 kPa). (what is ?) Infobox references

Droxinavir (also known as SC 55389A) was an experimental protease inhibitor researched by Pharmacia as a treatment for HIV infection. Its research and development was discontinued on March 06, 1995.
