= Sergolexole =

Chemical compound

Clinical data
- Other names: Sergolexol; LY-281067; LY281067; LY-281,067; 4-Methoxycyclohexyl-6-methyl-1-(propan-2-yl)ergoline-8β-carboxylate
- Drug class: Serotonin 5-HT_{2} receptor antagonist

Identifiers
- IUPAC name: (4-methoxycyclohexyl) (6aR,9R,10aR)-7-methyl-4-propan-2-yl-6,6a,8,9,10,10a-hexahydroindolo[4,3-fg]quinoline-9-carboxylate
- CAS Number: 108674-86-8
- PubChem CID: 60262
- UNII: J6TGA89COP
- CompTox Dashboard (EPA): DTXSID10148700

Chemical and physical data
- Formula: C_{26}H_{36}N_{2}O_{3}
- Molar mass: 424.585 g·mol^{−1}
- 3D model (JSmol): Interactive image
- SMILES: CC(C)N1C=C2C[C@@H]3[C@H](C[C@H](CN3C)C(=O)OC4CCC(CC4)OC)C5=C2C1=CC=C5
- InChI: InChI=1S/C26H36N2O3/c1-16(2)28-15-17-13-24-22(21-6-5-7-23(28)25(17)21)12-18(14-27(24)3)26(29)31-20-10-8-19(30-4)9-11-20/h5-7,15-16,18-20,22,24H,8-14H2,1-4H3/t18-,19?,20?,22-,24-/m1/s1; Key:RJBJIKXTJIZONR-FTNAIZGWSA-N

Sergolexole (INN; developmental code name LY-281067) is an ergoline derivative which acts as a selective antagonist of the serotonin 5-HT_{2} receptors. It has been used for various research applications, but was never developed for medical use.

== See also ==
- Substituted ergoline
