= Duteplase =

Plasminogen activator

Duteplase is a plasminogen activator.
