= Dalotuzumab =

Chemical compound

Monoclonal antibody
- Type: Whole antibody
- Source: Humanized (from mouse)
- Target: IGF-1 receptor

Clinical data
- ATC code: none

Identifiers
- CAS Number: 1005389-60-5
- ChemSpider: none
- UNII: 6YI1L648RH
- KEGG: D09746
- ECHA InfoCard: 100.205.569

Chemical and physical data
- Formula: C_{6528}H_{10086}N_{1730}O_{2018}S_{40}
- Molar mass: 146374.99 g·mol^{−1}

Dalotuzumab is an anti-IGF1 receptor (IGF1R) humanized monoclonal antibody designed for the potential treatment of various cancers. Common adverse effects include hyperglycemia, nausea, vomiting, and fatigue. Dalotuzumab was developed by Merck and Co., Inc.

== Indications ==
Dalotuzumab is indicated to treat breast cancer, colorectal cancer, multiple myeloma, neuroendocrine tumors, non-small cell lung cancer (NSCLC), pancreatic cancer, and solid tumors.

== Adverse effects ==
Adverse effects of Dalotuzumab:

- Infusion-related reaction
- Fever
- Chills
- Fatigue
- Weakness
- Weight loss
- Nausea
- Vomiting
- Rash
- Stomatitis
- Abdominal pain
- Intestinal bleeding
- Constipation
- Diarrhea
- Hyperglycemia
- Transaminitis
- Neutropenia
- Thrombocytopenia
- Pneumonitis

== Mechanism of action ==
Insulin-like growth factors (IGFs) are pivotal in cellular processes contributing to normal physiology as well as certain pathologies (e.g., cancer). The IGF family of proteins, also known as the IGF axis, consists of three ligands (insulin, IGF1, IGF2), three cell surface receptors (insulin receptor [IR], IGF1 receptor [IGF1R], IGF2 receptor [IGF2R]), and seven IGF binding proteins (IGFBP1-7). Notably, IGF1R serves as the primary receptor within the IGF axis. The IGF1R is a receptor tyrosine kinase (RTK) with a heterotetrameric structure composed of two extracellular α subunits and two transmembrane β subunits. Upon ligand-induced activation of this receptor, cytoplasmic adaptor proteins, Src-homology collagen (Shc) and insulin receptor substrate (IRS), are phosphorylated and, in turn, trigger the activation of the Ras/Raf/MEK/Erk and phosphoinositide 3-kinase (PI3K)/Akt signaling pathways, respectively. These signaling pathways are involved in the regulation of cell survival and cell cycle progression.

Furthermore, IGF1R amplification and overexpression have been observed in the formation of tumors and metastasis of various human cancers. These findings justified the development of anti-IGF1R therapies with the goal of inhibiting aberrant receptor activity and potentially yielding anticancer effects. Among said therapies, Dalotuzumab, a humanized monoclonal antibody, was designed to target and bind the extracellular domains of IGF1R, effectively blocking ligand activation of the receptor and preventing downstream signaling. Moreover, the binding of Dalotuzumab to IGF1R, as seen with other anti-IGF1R antibodies, downregulates the expression of the receptors by prompting the internalization and degradation of IGF1R.

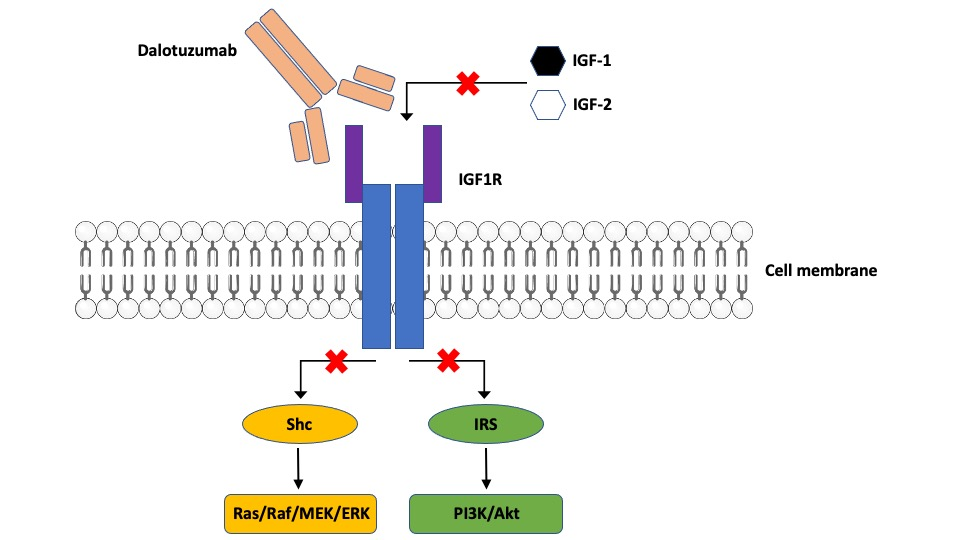
Figure 1: Mechanism of Action of Dalotuzumab

== History ==
There are more than 30 different anti-IGF1R candidate drugs involved in over 70 industry and academic-initiated clinical trials.

Dalotuzumab (MK-0646) was developed by Merck and Co., Inc. under license from French pharmaceutical company, Pierre Fabre. Dalotuzumab presently remains in clinical trials and has not been granted FDA approval.
