= Catheter =

Medical tubes inserted in the body to extract or administer substances

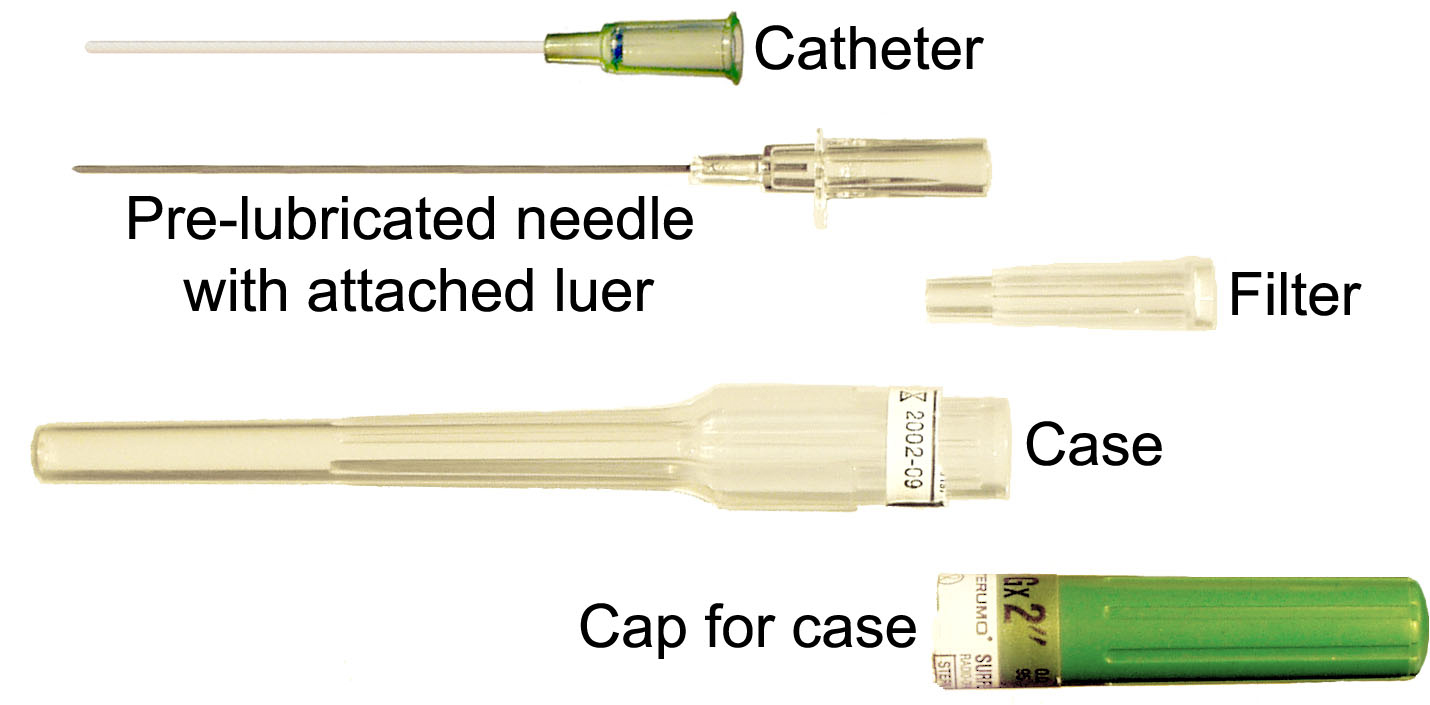
- Catheter disassembled
- [edit on Wikidata]

In medicine, a catheter (/ˈkæθətər/ KA-thə-tər) is a thin tube made from medical grade materials serving a broad range of functions. Catheters are medical devices that can be inserted in the body to treat diseases or perform a surgical procedure. Catheters are manufactured for specific applications, such as cardiovascular, urological, gastrointestinal, neurovascular and ophthalmic procedures. The process of inserting a catheter is called catheterization.

In most uses, a catheter is a thin, flexible tube (soft catheter) though catheters are available in varying levels of stiffness depending on the application. A catheter left inside the body, either temporarily or permanently, may be referred to as an "indwelling catheter" (for example, a peripherally inserted central catheter). A permanently inserted catheter may be referred to as a "permcath" (originally a trademark).

Catheters can be inserted into a body cavity, duct, or vessel, brain, skin or adipose tissue. Functionally, they allow drainage, administration of fluids or gases, access by surgical instruments, and also perform a wide variety of other tasks depending on the type of catheter. Special types of catheters, also called probes, are used in preclinical or clinical research for sampling of lipophilic and hydrophilic compounds, protein-bound and unbound drugs, neurotransmitters, peptides and proteins, antibodies, nanoparticles and nanocarriers, enzymes and vesicles.

== Etymology ==
"Catheter" (from Greek καθετήρ kathetḗr) comes from the Greek verb καθίεμαι kathíemai, meaning "to thrust into" or "to send down" because the catheter allowed fluid to be "sent down" from the body.

== Uses ==
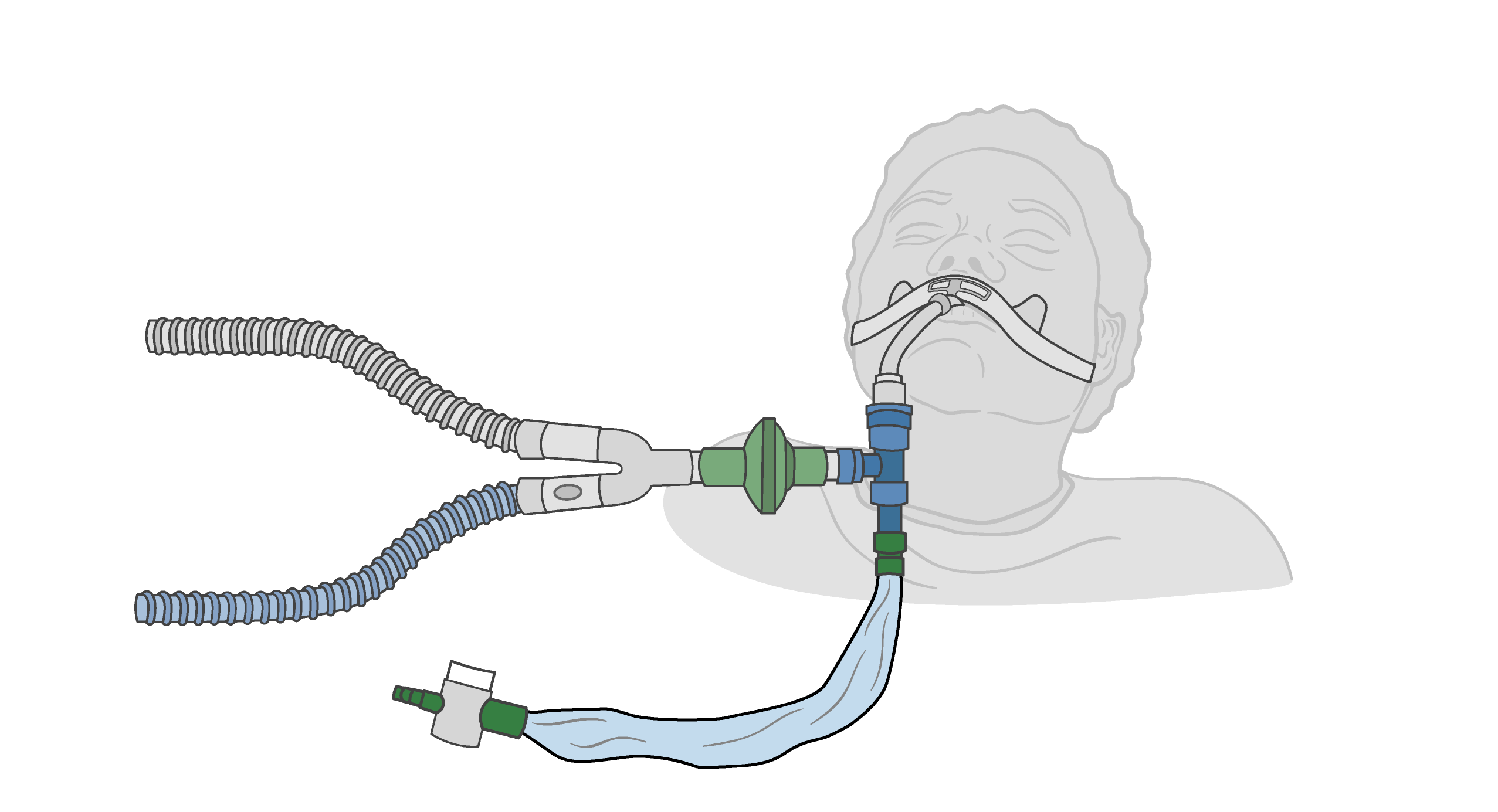
In-line suction catheter used in ventilator circuit for delivering air into lungs

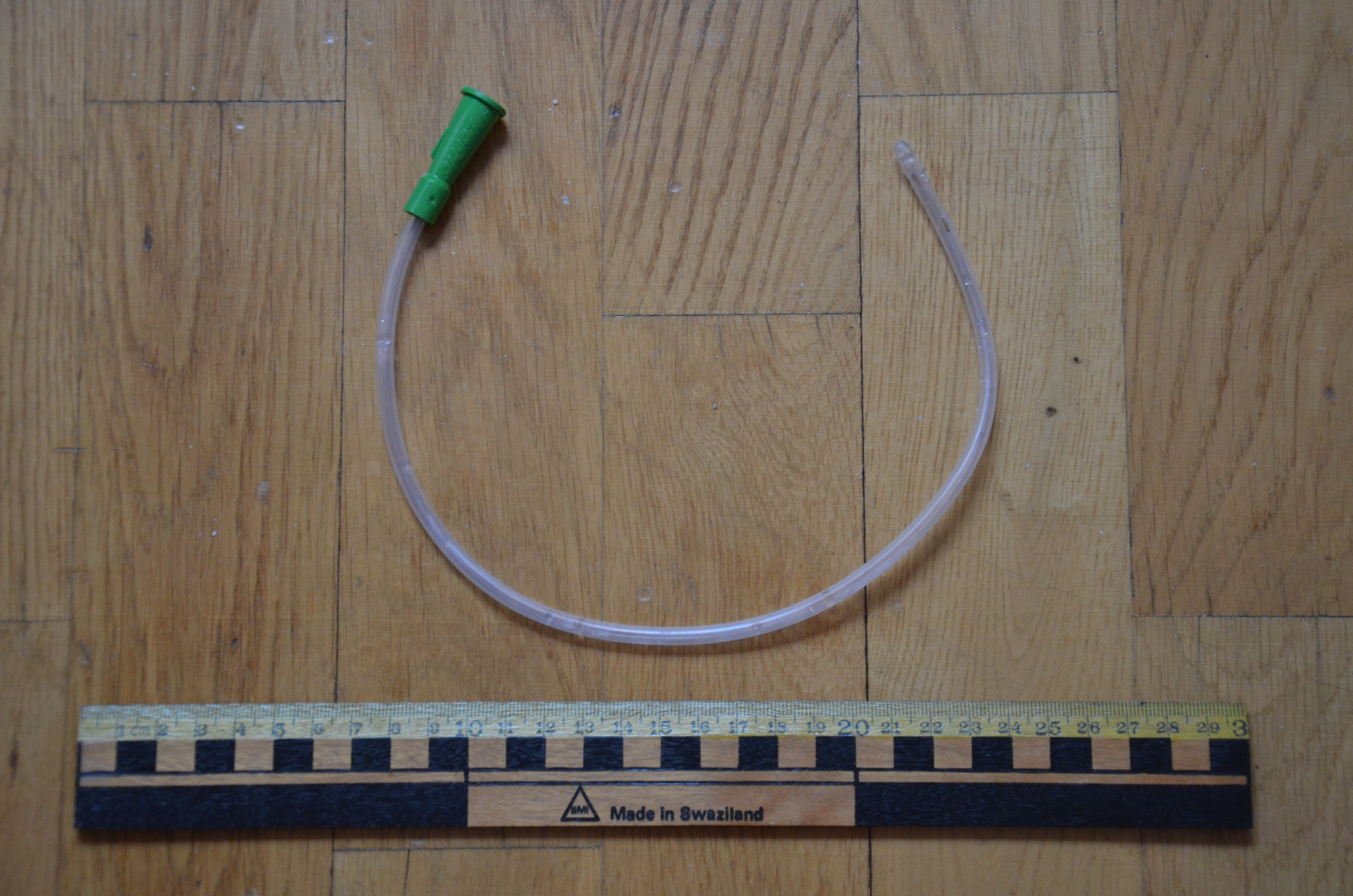
Single-use urinary catheter, 40 cm

Placement of a catheter into a particular part of the body may allow:

- Draining urine from the urinary bladder as in urinary catheterization, using intermittent catheters or Foley catheter inserted through urethra. When the urethra is damaged, suprapubic catheterisation is used instead. The suprapubic catheter is inserted through the lower part of the abdomen directly into the urinary bladder.
- drainage of urine from the kidney by percutaneous (through the skin) nephrostomy
- drainage of fluid collections, e.g. an abdominal abscess
- pigtail catheter: used to drain air from around the lung (pneumothorax)
- administration of intravenous fluids, medication or parenteral nutrition with a peripheral venous catheter or central venous catheter
- angioplasty, angiography, balloon septostomy, balloon sinuplasty, cardiac electrophysiology testing, catheter ablation. Often the Seldinger technique is used.
- direct measurement of blood pressure in an artery or vein
- direct measurement of intracranial pressure
- administration of anaesthetic medication into the epidural space, the subarachnoid space, or around a major nerve bundle such as the brachial plexus
- transfer of fertilized embryos, from in vitro fertilization, or sperm, during artificial insemination, into the uterus
- administration of oxygen, volatile anesthetic agents, and other breathing gases into the lungs using a tracheal tube
- subcutaneous administration of insulin or other medications, with the use of an infusion set and insulin pump

== History ==
=== Ancient inventors ===
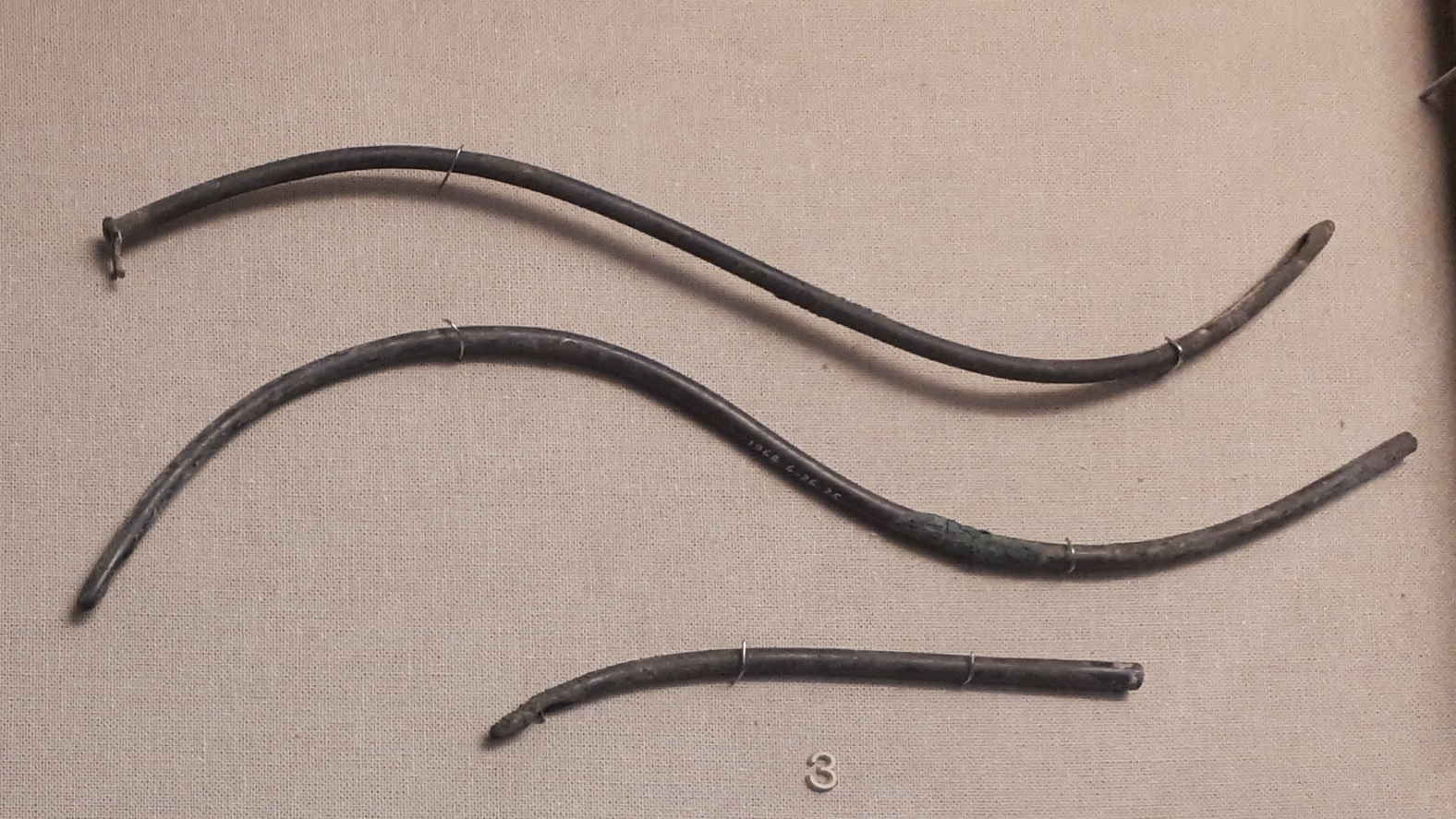
Catheters from the Roman Empire, 1st century CE

Ancient Chinese used onion stalks, the Romans, Hindus, and Greeks used tubes of wood or precious metals.

The ancient Egyptians created catheters from reeds.

=== Modern ===
The earliest invention of the flexible catheter was during the 18th century. Extending his inventiveness to his family's medical problems, Benjamin Franklin invented the flexible catheter in 1752 when his brother John suffered from bladder stones. Franklin's catheter was made of metal with segments hinged together with a wire enclosed to provide rigidity during insertion.

According to a footnote in his letter in Volume 4 of the Papers of Benjamin Franklin (1959), Franklin credits Francesco Roncelli-Pardino from 1720 as the inventor of a flexible catheter. In fact, Franklin claims the flexible catheter may have been designed even earlier.

An early modern application of the catheter was employed by Claude Bernard for the purpose of cardiac catheterization in 1844. The procedure involved entering a horse's ventricles via the jugular vein and carotid artery.

In 1929, Werner Forssman first performed central venous catheterization, work which led to the development of cardiac catherization as a treatment, for which he, André F. Cournand and Dickinson W. Richards would win the Nobel Prize for Medicine in 1959. Central venous catheterization allows for continuous administration of medications, fluids and blood products to a large vein, particularly in critically ill patients. Cardiac catheterization is the insertion of a catheter into one of the chambers of the heart, which is used for imaging, diagnosis, and the placement of devices such as stents.

David S. Sheridan invented the modern disposable catheter in the 1940s. Prior to this, some reusable catheters consisted of braided cotton tubes, which were varnished, heat-treated and polished. As these were primarily produced in France, the advent of World War II threatened the supply chain. Sheridan was dubbed the "Catheter King" by Forbes magazine in 1988. He also invented the modern "disposable" plastic endotracheal tube now used routinely in surgery.

Other reusable catheters consisted of red rubber tubes. Although sterilized prior to reuse, they still posed a high risk of infection and often led to the spread of disease.

To prevent clotting, catheters that are not in use may be filled with catheter lock solution.

== Materials ==
=== Urinary catheters ===
A range of polymers are used for the construction of catheters, including silicone rubber, nylon, polyurethane, polyethylene terephthalate (PET), latex, and thermoplastic elastomers. Silicone is one of the most common implantable choices because it is inert and unreactive to body fluids and a range of medical fluids with which it might come into contact. On the other hand, the polymer is weak mechanically, and a number of serious fractures have occurred in catheters. For example, silicone is used in Foley catheters where fractures have been reported, often requiring surgery to remove the tip left in the bladder.

=== Catheters used in interventional procedures ===
Depending on the mechanical characteristics required, assorted polymers and polymer-metal composites can be used to build catheters used for interventional purposes. Common materials include polyamide (nylon), polyether block amide, polyuerathane, polyethylene terephthalate, and polyimides. These materials are often used in combination with each other and are frequently layered on top of stainless steel braiding, laser-cut stainless steel tubing, or other scaffold-like structures to impart desirable handling characteristics to the catheter, all dependent on the intended application. For example, the materials and the architectures used to manufacture vascular catheters for neurological applications might differ significantly from catheters destined for cardiovascular use.

Guiding catheters (catheters that guides angioplasty balloons and stents) is made up of polytetrafluoroethylene (PTFE) innermost layer which is lubricious, followed by stainless steel braid wire outer layer which helps to provide support for the catheter and prevent kinking while travelling through blood vessels, and Nylon elastomer outermost layer which provides extra support for the catheter and preserve the curvature of the catheter while passing through tortuous vessels.

To enhance ease of insertion, some catheters have a lubricious surface coating to lessen friction. A lubricious coating creates a smooth, slippery film making the catheter easier to insert.

== Interventional procedures ==
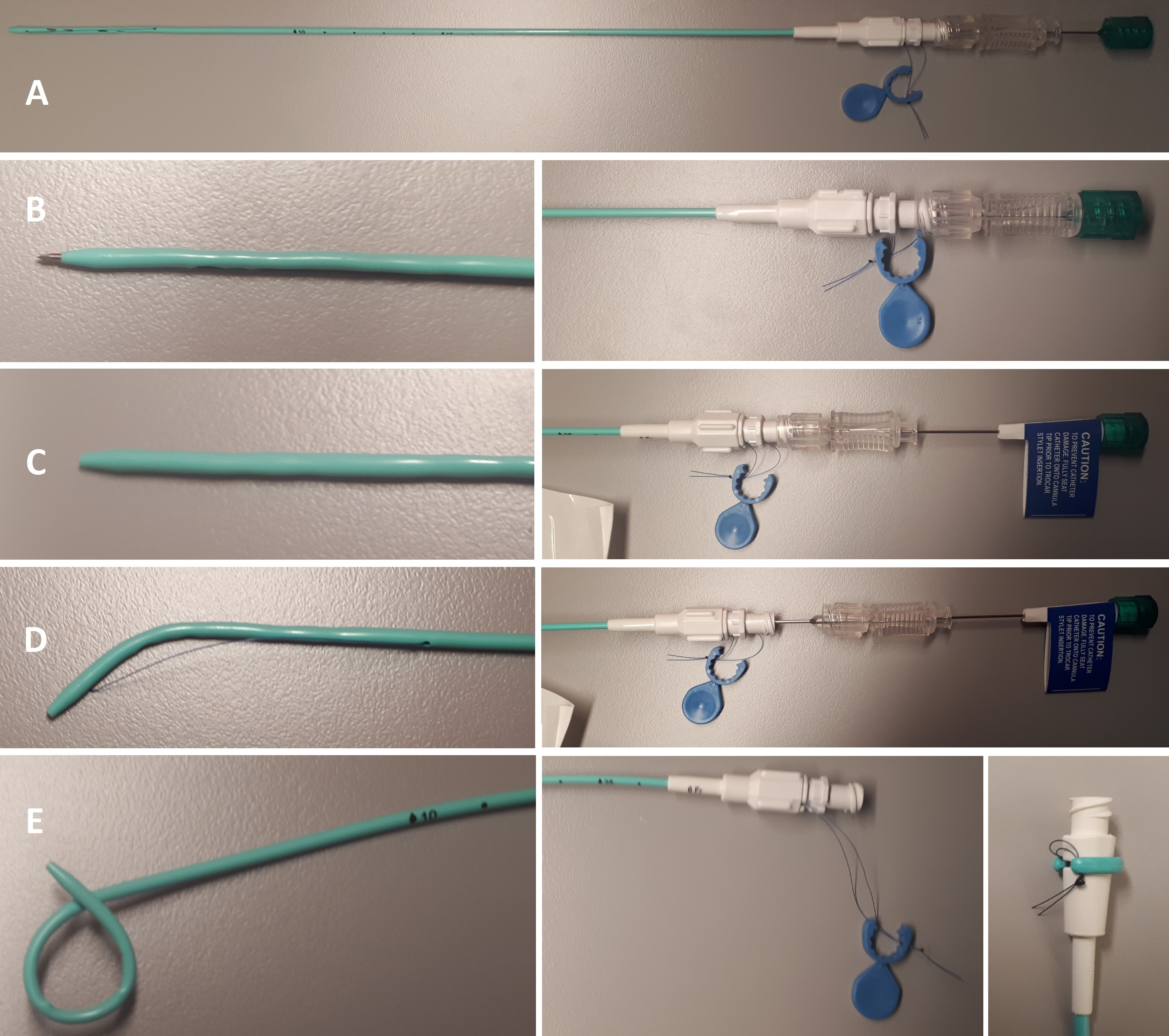
Various settings of a 6 French pigtail catheter with locking string, obturator (also called stiffening cannula) and puncture needle. A. Overview. B. Both puncture needle and obturator engaged, allowing for direct insertion. C. Puncture needle retracted. Obturator engaged. Used for example in steady advancement of the catheter on a guidewire. D. Both obturator and puncture needle retracted, when the catheter is in place. E. Locking string is pulled (bottom center) and then wrapped and attached to the superficial end of the catheter.

=== Diagnostic catheters ===
There are various catheters used in angiography procedures. Diagnostic catheters direct wires through blood vessels. Radiocontrast agent is then injected through the catheter to visualise the vessels via various imaging methods such as computed tomography (CT), projectional radiography, and fluoroscopy. Pigtail catheter is a non-selective catheter with multiple side holes that can deliver large volumes of contrast into a blood vessel for imaging purposes. Cobra catheter is a selective catheter used to catheterise downgoing vessels in the abdomen. Cobra catheters move forward by pushing and are removed by pulling. Sidewinder catheter is a selective catheter is used to navigate the aorta. Headhunter, Newton, Simmons, Bentson, and Berenstein catheters are used to navigate them into one of the three branches of the arch of aorta. Yashiro Catheter is a selective, hydrophilic catheter designed for optimal entry into celiac trunk. Whereas endothelial cell sampling through endovascular sampling with coils, stents, stent retrievers, or guidewires suffer from poor selectivity and a low or highly variable cell yield, a micro-3D-printed device adapted for endovascular techniques can harvest endothelial cells for transcriptomic analysis.

=== Balloon catheters ===
There are also balloon catheters used in angioplasty procedures such as plain balloon catheters that is useful in passing tight vessel stenosis, drug coated balloons that contains paclitaxel on the surface to prevent smooth muscle cells proliferation of the vessel walls, thus reducing the likehood of vessel blockage in the future, high pressure balloons that can open stubborn vessel stenoses in veins and arteriovenous fistula, and cutting balloon angioplasty that contains 3 to 4 small blades on its surface (endotomes) that helps to control the distribution of balloon dilatation more uniformly and cut through resistant stenosis due to fibrous scar tissue.

=== Dialysis catheters ===
There is no difference in achieving adequacy of blood flow, period of catheter usage, infection, and thromboembolic risk whether the dialysis catheter has step-tip, split-tip, or symmetrical tip. The Palindrome catheter is superior to Permcath catheter in terms of maximum blood flow, dialysis adequacy, and annual patency rate. Similar to Permcath, Palindrome catheter has a high infection and thromboembolism rate.

== Adverse effects ==
In interventional procedures, Teflon catheters (which are hydrophobic) have higher risk of thrombus formation when compared to polyurethane catheters. The longer the duration of the catheter left inside the body, the higher the risk of thrombus formation. Larger catheters increase the risk of thrombus formation around the catheter, because they can block the flow of blood.

"Any foreign object in the body carries an infection risk, and a catheter can serve as a superhighway for bacteria to enter the bloodstream or body", according to Milisa Manojlovich, a professor at the University of Michigan School of Nursing.

Catheters can be difficult to clean, and therefore harbor antibiotic resistant or otherwise pathogenic bacteria.

== See also ==
- Cannula
- Foley catheter
- French catheter scale
- Gastrostomy
- G-Tube
- Jejunostomy
- Stent
- Catheter lock solution
