= 9α-Fluorocortisone =

Chemical compound

Clinical data
- Other names: Fluorocortisone; Alfluorone; 9α-Fluoro-17α,21-dihydroxypregn-4-ene-3,11,20-trione
- Drug class: Corticosteroid; Glucocorticoid

Identifiers
- IUPAC name: (8S,9R,10S,13S,14S,17R)-9-Fluoro-17-hydroxy-17-(2-hydroxyacetyl)-10,13-dimethyl-2,6,7,8,12,14,15,16-octahydro-1H-cyclopenta[a]phenanthrene-3,11-dione
- CAS Number: 79-60-7
- PubChem CID: 16118707
- ChemSpider: 17275912
- UNII: 9AV2MHJ5Z6

Chemical and physical data
- Formula: C_{21}H_{27}FO_{5}
- Molar mass: 378.440 g·mol^{−1}
- 3D model (JSmol): Interactive image
- SMILES: C[C@]12CCC(=O)C=C1CC[C@@H]3[C@@]2(C(=O)C[C@]4([C@H]3CC[C@@]4(C(=O)CO)O)C)F
- InChI: InChI=1S/C21H27FO5/c1-18-7-5-13(24)9-12(18)3-4-15-14-6-8-20(27,17(26)11-23)19(14,2)10-16(25)21(15,18)22/h9,14-15,23,27H,3-8,10-11H2,1-2H3/t14-,15-,18-,19-,20-,21-/m0/s1; Key:BHDHELFREODRJK-XRYUJSLGSA-N

9α-Fluorocortisone, also known as alfluorone, is a synthetic glucocorticoid corticosteroid which was never marketed.
