= Denecimig =

Medication

Clinical data
- Trade names: Frehemgo
- Other names: MIM-8, NN-7769
- Routes of administration: Subcutaneous
- Drug class: Antihemorrhagic agent
- ATC code: None

Legal status
- Legal status: EU: Rx-only; SA: Rx-only

Identifiers
- CAS Number: 2488745-86-2
- DrugBank: DB18426
- UNII: EUV85RR8DJ
- KEGG: D12797
- ChEMBL: ChEMBL5314670

Chemical and physical data
- Formula: C_{6464}H_{9949}N_{1712}O_{2024}S_{45}
- Molar mass: 145472.36 g·mol^{−1}

Denecimig, sold under the brand name Frehemgo, is a antihemorrhagic medication used for the treatment of hemophilia A. It is a fully human modified immunoglobulin G4 bispecific antibody that acts as a mimetic of activated factor VIII.

The most common side effects include injection site reactions, prothrombin fragment 1.2 increased and fibrin D dimer increased.

== Medical uses ==
Denecimig is indicated for the routine prophylaxis of bleeding episodes in people with hemophilia A, with or without factor VIII inhibitors.

== Adverse effects ==
The most common side effects include injection site reactions, prothrombin fragment 1.2 increased and fibrin D dimer increased.

== Society and culture ==
=== Legal status ===
Denecimig was approved for medical use in Saudi Arabia in September 2026.

In September 2026, the Committee for Medicinal Products for Human Use of the European Medicines Agency adopted a positive opinion, recommending the granting of a marketing authorization for the medicinal product Frehemgo, intended for routine prophylaxis of bleeding episodes in people with hemophilia A. The applicant for this medicinal product is Novo Nordisk. Denecimig was authorized for medical use in the European Union in November 2026.

=== Names ===
Denecimig is the international nonproprietary name.

Denecimig is sold under the brand name Frehemgo.
