= Dexbrompheniramine/pseudoephedrine =

Combination medication

Combination of
- Dexbrompheniramine: Antihistamine
- Pseudoephedrine: Decongestant

Clinical data
- Trade names: Drixoral
- AHFS/Drugs.com: Micromedex Detailed Consumer Information
- ATC code: R06AB56 (WHO)

Legal status
- Legal status: US: OTC

Identifiers
- CAS Number: 2391-03-9

Dexbrompheniramine/pseudoephedrine (trade name Drixoral) is a combination medication that contains the antihistamine dexbrompheniramine maleate and the decongestant pseudoephedrine sulfate. It was used to treat symptoms associated with allergies and colds such as itchy and watery eyes, runny nose, nasal and sinus congestion, and sneezing. Because it contains pseudoephedrine, its purchase in the United States was severely restricted by the Combat Methamphetamine Epidemic Act of 2005 over fears that any product containing pseudoephedrine can be used to make methamphetamine.

== Availability ==
As of 2008, Drixoral was removed from the US market by manufacturer Merck. The company's updated website attributes "changing [their] manufacturing location" for the supply disruption and currently states "it is unlikely product will be available in 2010". However, the trade name Drixoral is now used in Canada for an oxymetazoline hydrochloride nasal spray.

== Commercials ==
Drixoral was a very popular cold relief medicine advertised on U.S. television in the 1980s. Many of their commercials were narrated by Burgess Meredith.
