= Dectaflur =

Fluoride-containing substance

Clinical data
- Routes of administration: Topical (gel, solution)
- ATC code: none

Legal status
- Legal status: In general: Over-the-counter (OTC)

Identifiers
- IUPAC name: 9-Octadecenylamine hydrofluoride
- CAS Number: 7333-84-8
- PubChem CID: 6433498
- ChemSpider: 4938643
- UNII: Q3B1Y93C1S
- ChEMBL: ChEMBL2106567
- CompTox Dashboard (EPA): DTXSID7073484
- ECHA InfoCard: 100.297.781

Chemical and physical data
- Formula: C_{18}H_{38}FN
- Molar mass: 287.507 g·mol^{−1}
- 3D model (JSmol): Interactive image
- SMILES: [F-].C(=C/CCCCCCCC)\CCCCCCCC[NH3+]
- InChI: InChI=1S/C18H37N.FH/c1-2-3-4-5-6-7-8-9-10-11-12-13-14-15-16-17-18-19;/h9-10H,2-8,11-19H2,1H3;1H/b10-9+; Key:QGSCPWWHMSCFOV-RRABGKBLSA-N

Dectaflur (INN) is a fluoride-containing substance used for the prevention and treatment of dental caries, sensitive teeth, and the refluoridation of damaged tooth enamel, typically in combination with olaflur.

== Chemistry and mechanism of action ==
Dectaflur consists of oleyl amine (the amine corresponding to oleyl alcohol) and hydrofluoric acid. Oleyl amine with its long lipophilic hydrocarbon chain has surfactant properties. It forms a film layer on the surface of teeth, which facilitates incorporation of fluoride into the top layers of the enamel, reaching a depth of only a few nanometers. The precise mechanism of action is unknown.

== Side effects ==
Like other fluorides, dectaflur is toxic when overdosed over an extended period of time. Especially in children, before the development of the permanent teeth, overdosage can lead to dental fluorosis.
