= Miroprofen =

Analgesic and NSAID

Clinical data
- Other names: Antopen; BRN 0888858; NSC 261037; Ro 07-0582; Y 9213; 2-[4-(1,7-diazabicyclo[4.3.0]nona-2,4,6,8-tetraen-8-yl)phenyl]propanoic acid
- ATC code: none

Identifiers
- IUPAC name: (RS)-2-(4-imidazo[1,2-a]pyridin-2-ylphenyl)propanoic acid
- CAS Number: 55843-86-2
- PubChem CID: 68752
- ChemSpider: 61997
- UNII: S00I5XG484
- ChEBI: CHEBI:76249
- CompTox Dashboard (EPA): DTXSID30866515

Chemical and physical data
- Formula: C_{16}H_{14}N_{2}O_{2}
- Molar mass: 266.300 g·mol^{−1}
- 3D model (JSmol): Interactive image
- Chirality: Racemic mixture
- SMILES: O=C(O)C(c3ccc(c1nc2ccccn2c1)cc3)C
- InChI: InChI=1S/C16H14N2O2/c1-11(16(19)20)12-5-7-13(8-6-12)14-10-18-9-3-2-4-15(18)17-14/h2-11H,1H3,(H,19,20); Key:OJGQFYYLKNCIJD-UHFFFAOYSA-N

Miroprofen (INN) is an analgesic and NSAID, meaning that it has anti-inflammatory, antipyretic and antiplatelet aggregation activity. Chemically it is a carboxylic acid belonging to the group of phenylpropanoic acids.
