= TNFRSF12A =

Protein-coding gene in the species Homo sapiens

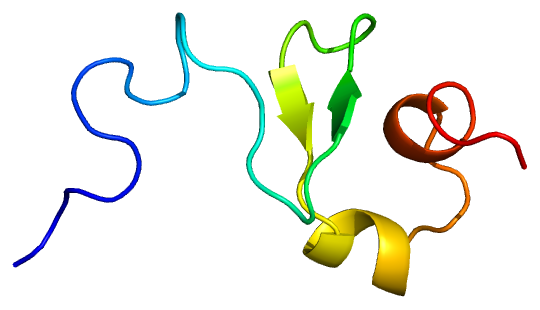

Identifiers
- Aliases: TNFRSF12A, CD266, FN14, TWEAKR, tumor necrosis factor receptor superfamily member 12A, TNF receptor superfamily member 12A
- External IDs: OMIM: 605914; MGI: 1351484; GeneCards: TNFRSF12A
Available structures
PDB	Ortholog search: PDBe RCSB
PDB	List of PDB id codes 2EQP, 2KMZ, 2RPJ

Gene location (Human)
Chr.	Chromosome 16 (human)
Band	16p13.3	Start	3,018,445 bp
Band	16p13.3	End	3,022,383 bp

Gene location (Mouse)
Chr.	Chromosome 17 (mouse)
Band	17|17 A3.3	Start	23,894,419 bp
Band	17|17 A3.3	End	23,896,442 bp
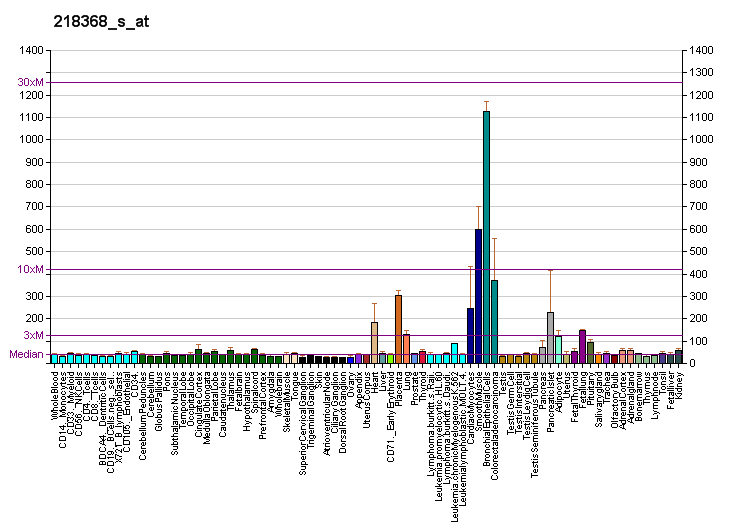
RNA expression pattern
Bgee	Human / Mouse (ortholog); Top expressed in: apex of heart; ascending aorta; body of pancreas; beta cell; anterior pituitary; gallbladder; right coronary artery; upper lobe of left lung; left ventricle; Descending thoracic aorta / Top expressed in: interventricular septum; decidua; muscle of thigh; adrenal gland; soleus muscle; endothelial cell of lymphatic vessel; lip; yolk sac; right ventricle; gastrula; More reference expression data
BioGPS	More reference expression data
Gene ontology
Molecular function	protein binding
Cellular component	ruffle; integral component of membrane; cell surface; plasma membrane; membrane
Biological process	apoptotic process; substrate-dependent cell migration, cell attachment to substrate; multicellular organism development; positive regulation of extrinsic apoptotic signaling pathway; cell differentiation; positive regulation of axon extension; cell adhesion; tumor necrosis factor-mediated signaling pathway; regulation of wound healing; regulation of angiogenesis; extrinsic apoptotic signaling pathway; angiogenesis; positive regulation of apoptotic process
Sources:Amigo / QuickGO
Orthologs
Databases	NCBI: entry; OMA: entry
Species	Human	Mouse
Entrez	51330	27279
Ensembl	ENSG00000006327	ENSMUSG00000023905
UniProt	Q9NP84	Q9CR75
RefSeq (mRNA)	NM_016639	NM_001161746; NM_013749
RefSeq (protein)	NP_057723	NP_001155218; NP_038777
Location (UCSC)	Chr 16: 3.02 – 3.02 Mb	Chr 17: 23.89 – 23.9 Mb
PubMed search
- Wikidata
View/Edit Human	View/Edit Mouse

Tumor necrosis factor receptor superfamily member 12A also known as the TWEAK receptor (TWEAKR) is a protein that in humans is encoded by the TNFRSF12A gene.

Other names used when talking about TNFRSF12A are fibroblast growth factor-inducible immediate-early response protein 14 (FN14). TNFRSF12A is a unique member of the Tumor Necrosis Factor Receptor superfamily. TNFRSF12A is the smallest member of the Tumor Necrosis Factor Receptor superfamily and the gene expression is highly regulated in a live organism and a petri dish. TNFRSF12A is the receptor for the TWEAK which is its ligand. Many other members of the Tumor necrosis factor superfamily can bind to other ligands but this receptor can only bind to TNFRSF12. TNFRSF12A is found in many human tissues, including the heart, placenta, lung, skeletal muscle, kidney, and pancreas. It is involved in several biological processes, such as inflammatory reactions, angiogenesis, cell proliferation, and cell death.

== Structure ==
This receptor can be found in chromosome 16 in humans and chromosome 17 in mice. The TNFRSF12A receptors in mice and humans are 93 percent similar. This receptor is made of one hundred and twenty-eight amino acids and one cysteine-rich domain then once fully developed the amino acids drop to one hundred and two amino acids. This receptor is a type I transmembrane protein because of the disulfide bonds that form the cysteine-rich domains without a death domain. Although the receptor does not have a death domain it can still produce a weak death cell signal. The receptor is made of helices, the β-sheet, and the loop regions, and disulfide bonds for CRD. For further context, the CRD's tertiary structure consists of a beta-sheet with two strands, followed by a 3(10) helix and a C-terminal alpha-helix, and is held together by three disulfide bonds that connect Cys36-Cys49, Cys52-Cys67, and Cys55-Cys64. When the disulfide bond connectivities and tertiary structures of the Fn14 CRD were compared to those of other CRDs, it was discovered that it is similar to the fourth CRD of TNF receptor 1 (A1-C2 module type), but not to the CRD of B-cell maturation antigen and the second CRD of transmembrane activator and CAML (calcium modulator and cyclophilin ligand) interactor (A1-D2). The cysteine-rich domain is made of 53 amino acid residues which are outside the call of the ligand binding region.

== Discovery ==
In 1997 the discovery of the ligand TNFRSF12 led to the discovery of the receptor TNFRSF12A in 1999. The receptor was found in chromosome 17 inside the T-locus on a mouse while doing research about polypeptide growth factors. When they were trying to identify on fibroblast growth factors (FGF) they discovered fibroblast growth factor-inducible immediate-early response protein, FN14, and did not know what protein had similar structures as it as well. When it was discovered they decided to name it FN14 because the projected molecular mass of about 10.8 kilodaltons. Gene expression was also found in many of the major organs of newborn animals, and in the adult heart, kidney, lung, ovary, and skin. This led to the possibility of FN14 being a ligand binding site and more research on this receptor. It was determined that 93 percent of the structure was made of amino acids when comparing the receptor structure of human or mouse form.

== Therapeutic Strategies ==
Tumor necrosis factors are important regulators of many different cells and tissues which makes TNFRSF12A important for expressing many different cells and tissues. TNFRSF12A is expressed in many different cells and tissues due to the function of TNFRSF12. What makes TNFRSF12A stand out other than its size from the other Tumor necrosis factors receptor superfamily is that the gene expression is extremely regulated in a live organism and in a petri dish. There was a recent study done in 2023 about how FN14 signaling contributes to the growth and duplication of tumors (angiogenesis). Increased expressions or interactions of TNFRSF12A and TNFRSF12 have been found to correlate with diseases and morbidity such as acute ischemic stroke, Rheumatoid Arthritis, Systemic Lymphocytic Erythematosus (SLE), Multiple Sclerosis and Cancer. In a clinical study, the overall severity of the disease was found to be reduced by intraperitoneal injection of an anti-TWEAK neutralizing monoclonal antibody in rats and mice. The result of the clinical study implied that Fn14 was a tumor biomarker and that it should be taken into account as a potential new cancer treatment target. This leads to the possibility of blocking the ligand from binding to the receptor to stop the expression of TRNRSF12A to reduce or even stop the gene expression. There are other current clinical studies on how TNFRSF12A is expressed and affects different cell types. Studies have shown that high expression levels can lead to worse outcomes.

== Interactions ==
TNFRSF12A has been shown to interact with TNFRSF12 and TNFR-associated factor (TRAF) 1, 2, 3 and 5.
