= Isoflupredone =

Chemical compound

Clinical data
- Other names: 9α-Fluoroprednisolone; Fluoroprednisolone; Deltafludrocortisone; δ-Fludrocortisone; δ-Fluorocortisone; 1-Dehydro-9α-fluorohydrocortisone; 9α-Fluoro-11β,17α,21-trihydroxypregna-1,4-diene-3,20-dione
- Drug class: Corticosteroid; Glucocorticoid

Identifiers
- IUPAC name: (8S,9R,10S,11S,13S,14S,17R)-9-Fluoro-11,17-dihydroxy-17-(2-hydroxyacetyl)-10,13-dimethyl-6,7,8,11,12,14,15,16-octahydrocyclopenta[a]phenanthren-3-one
- CAS Number: 338-95-4
- PubChem CID: 127516
- ChemSpider: 113134
- UNII: HYS0B45Z2S
- KEGG: C14484
- ChEBI: CHEBI:34511
- CompTox Dashboard (EPA): DTXSID101009333
- ECHA InfoCard: 100.005.839

Chemical and physical data
- Formula: C_{21}H_{27}FO_{5}
- Molar mass: 378.440 g·mol^{−1}
- 3D model (JSmol): Interactive image
- SMILES: C[C@]12C[C@@H]([C@]3([C@H]([C@@H]1CC[C@@]2(C(=O)CO)O)CCC4=CC(=O)C=C[C@@]43C)F)O
- InChI: InChI=1S/C21H27FO5/c1-18-7-5-13(24)9-12(18)3-4-15-14-6-8-20(27,17(26)11-23)19(14,2)10-16(25)21(15,18)22/h5,7,9,14-16,23,25,27H,3-4,6,8,10-11H2,1-2H3/t14-,15-,16-,18-,19-,20-,21-/m0/s1; Key:WAIJIHDWAKJCBX-BULBTXNYSA-N

Isoflupredone, also known as deltafludrocortisone and 9α-fluoroprednisolone, is a synthetic glucocorticoid corticosteroid which was never marketed.

Its acetate ester, isoflupredone acetate, is used in veterinary medicine.
