= Detumomab =

Monoclonal antibody

Monoclonal antibody
- Type: Whole antibody
- Source: Mouse
- Target: B-lymphoma cell

Clinical data
- ATC code: none

Identifiers
- CAS Number: 145832-33-3
- ChemSpider: none
- UNII: 8Z3Q8X4UAD

Detumomab is a mouse monoclonal antibody targeting human B-cell lymphoma.
