= Doliracetam =

Chemical compound

Clinical data
- ATC code: none

Legal status
- Legal status: In general: unscheduled

Identifiers
- IUPAC name: 2-(2-oxo-3-phenyl-3H-indol-1-yl)acetamide
- CAS Number: 84901-45-1
- PubChem CID: 208851
- ChemSpider: 180958
- UNII: N70177JQTB
- ChEMBL: ChEMBL2106519
- CompTox Dashboard (EPA): DTXSID20868846

Chemical and physical data
- Formula: C_{16}H_{14}N_{2}O_{2}
- Molar mass: 266.300 g·mol^{−1}
- 3D model (JSmol): Interactive image
- SMILES: C1=CC=C(C=C1)C2C3=CC=CC=C3N(C2=O)CC(=O)N
- InChI: InChI=1S/C16H14N2O2/c17-14(19)10-18-13-9-5-4-8-12(13)15(16(18)20)11-6-2-1-3-7-11/h1-9,15H,10H2,(H2,17,19); Key:MVZYGLQQNPFARE-UHFFFAOYSA-N

Doliracetam is a nootropic drug (cognition enhancer) from the racetam family used in treatment of epilepsy.

According to the Hoechst patent title, it has neuroanabolic action.

== See also ==
- Piracetam
