= Dazepinil =

Antidepressant

Clinical data
- Other names: HRP 543

Identifiers
- IUPAC name: 2,3-dimethyl-4-phenyl-4,5-dihydro-1,3-benzodiazepine
- CAS Number: 75991-50-3 75241-19-9
- PubChem CID: 53432
- ChemSpider: 48264
- UNII: 730EPY2HSM
- ChEMBL: ChEMBL117042
- CompTox Dashboard (EPA): DTXSID20996719

Chemical and physical data
- Formula: C_{17}H_{18}N_{2}
- Molar mass: 250.345 g·mol^{−1}
- 3D model (JSmol): Interactive image
- SMILES: CC1=NC2=CC=CC=C2CC(N1C)C3=CC=CC=C3
- InChI: InChI=1S/C17H18N2/c1-13-18-16-11-7-6-10-15(16)12-17(19(13)2)14-8-4-3-5-9-14/h3-11,17H,12H2,1-2H3; Key:STDYWHYUOSSCBO-UHFFFAOYSA-N

Dazepinil, classified as a tricyclic antidepressant, is a pharmacological compound that has never been approved for medical use. Its mechanism of action involves inhibiting the reuptake of norepinephrine and serotonin at the synaptic cleft, thereby enhancing neurotransmitter availability in the brain.

Dazepinil is a 1,3-benzodiazepine derivative that has been reported to have marked anti-tetrabenazine activity, to inhibit neurotransmitter uptake into rat brain synaptosomes and to lack anticholinergic activity as evidenced by negligible displacement of [3H]quinuclidinyl benzylate from rat brain muscarinic receptors, and by negligible antagonism of the cholinergic stimulation produced by physostigmine or oxotremorine. This suggests that HRP 534 might be clinically useful as a novel antidepressant which is devoid of anticholinergic side-effects.

== Synthesis ==
The chemical synthesis has been reported:

Dazepinil synthesis

The base catalyzed reaction between N-Boc-o-toluidine [74965-31-4] (1) and N-Benzylidenemethylamine [622-29-7] (2) gives PC20452101. The removal of the Boc protecting group by treatment with trifluoroacetic acid afforded 2-[2-(Methylamino)-2-phenylethyl]aniline, PC10857157 (3). Reaction of the resulting diamine with methyl orthoacetate adds the required extra carbon atom and leads to the formation of dazepinil (4).
