= Dazoxiben =

Names
- Preferred IUPAC name 4-[2-(1H-Imidazol-1-yl)ethoxy]benzoic acid

Identifiers
CAS Number	78218-09-4
3D model (JSmol)	Interactive image
ChEMBL	ChEMBL267473
ChemSpider	47885
DrugBank	DB03052
IUPHAR/BPS	5175
PubChem CID	53001
UNII	09ZFC7974Q
CompTox Dashboard (EPA)	DTXSID9045639
- InChI: InChI=1S/C12H12N2O3/c15-12(16)10-1-3-11(4-2-10)17-8-7-14-6-5-13-9-14/h1-6,9H,7-8H2,(H,15,16) Key: XQGZSYKGWHUSDH-UHFFFAOYSA-N; InChI=1/C12H12N2O3/c15-12(16)10-1-3-11(4-2-10)17-8-7-14-6-5-13-9-14/h1-6,9H,7-8H2,(H,15,16) Key: XQGZSYKGWHUSDH-UHFFFAOYAY
- SMILES: O=C(O)c2ccc(OCCn1ccnc1)cc2

Properties
Chemical formula	C_{12}H_{12}N_{2}O_{3}
Molar mass	232.239 g·mol^{−1}
- Except where otherwise noted, data are given for materials in their standard state (at 25 °C [77 °F], 100 kPa). verify (what is ?) Infobox references

Dazoxiben is an orally active thromboxane synthase inhibitor. It has shown a significant clinical improvement in patients with Raynaud's syndrome.

== Synthesis ==
Dazoxiben synthesis:

One convenient synthesis starts with the O-chloroethyl ether of p-hydroxybenzamide and proceeds bydisplacement with imidazole to give 2. Hydrolysis of the amide function completes the synthesis of dazoxiben.
