= Dexbrompheniramine =

Chemical compound

Clinical data
- Trade names: Drixoril, Conex, Dixaphedrine
- AHFS/Drugs.com: Multum Consumer Information
- Routes of administration: Oral
- ATC code: R06AB06 (WHO)

Legal status
- Legal status: CA: OTC; US: OTC

Pharmacokinetic data
- Elimination half-life: 25 hours

Identifiers
- IUPAC name: (3S)-3-(4-bromophenyl)-N,N-dimethyl-3-pyridin-2-yl-propan-1-amine
- CAS Number: 132-21-8
- PubChem CID: 16960
- IUPHAR/BPS: 7588
- DrugBank: DB00405
- ChemSpider: 16068
- UNII: 75T64B71RP
- ChEBI: CHEBI:59269
- ChEMBL: ChEMBL1201287
- CompTox Dashboard (EPA): DTXSID8022905
- ECHA InfoCard: 100.004.595

Chemical and physical data
- Formula: C_{16}H_{19}BrN_{2}
- Molar mass: 319.246 g·mol^{−1}
- 3D model (JSmol): Interactive image
- SMILES: Brc1ccc(cc1)[C@@H](c2ncccc2)CCN(C)C
- InChI: InChI=1S/C16H19BrN2/c1-19(2)12-10-15(16-5-3-4-11-18-16)13-6-8-14(17)9-7-13/h3-9,11,15H,10,12H2,1-2H3/t15-/m0/s1; Key:ZDIGNSYAACHWNL-HNNXBMFYSA-N

Dexbrompheniramine is an antihistamine with anticholinergic properties used to treat allergic conditions such as hay fever or urticaria. It is the pharmacologically active dextrorotatory isomer of brompheniramine. It was formerly marketed in combination with pseudoephedrine under the name Drixoral in the US and Canada. It is an alkylamine antihistamine.

Dexbrompheniramine is a first generation antihistamine that reduces the effects of the neurotransmitter histamine in the body: sneezing, itching, watery eyes, and runny nose.

== Interactions ==
MAO inhibitors within 14 days. MAO inhibitors include isocarboxazid, linezolid, phenelzine, rasagiline, selegiline, and tranylcypromine.

Drinking alcohol can increase side effects of dexbrompheniramine.
