= Descinolone =

Chemical compound

Clinical data
- Other names: Desoxytriamcinolone; 21-Desoxytriamcinolone; 9α-Fluoro-11β,16α,17α-trihydroxypregna-1,4-diene-3,20-dione
- Drug class: Corticosteroid; Glucocorticoid

Identifiers
- IUPAC name: (8S,9R,10S,11S,13S,14S,16R,17S)-17-Acetyl-9-fluoro-11,16,17-trihydroxy-10,13-dimethyl-6,7,8,11,12,14,15,16-octahydrocyclopenta[a]phenanthren-3-one
- CAS Number: 595-52-8
- PubChem CID: 250822
- ChemSpider: 219695
- UNII: FBV60529GN
- KEGG: C15361
- ChEBI: CHEBI:79863
- ChEMBL: ChEMBL3250066
- CompTox Dashboard (EPA): DTXSID101024230

Chemical and physical data
- Formula: C_{21}H_{27}FO_{5}
- Molar mass: 378.440 g·mol^{−1}
- 3D model (JSmol): Interactive image
- SMILES: CC(=O)[C@]1([C@@H](C[C@@H]2[C@@]1(C[C@@H]([C@]3([C@H]2CCC4=CC(=O)C=C[C@@]43C)F)O)C)O)O
- InChI: InChI=1S/C21H27FO5/c1-11(23)21(27)16(25)9-15-14-5-4-12-8-13(24)6-7-18(12,2)20(14,22)17(26)10-19(15,21)3/h6-8,14-17,25-27H,4-5,9-10H2,1-3H3/t14-,15-,16+,17-,18-,19-,20-,21+/m0/s1; Key:DYCBAFABWCTLEN-PMVIMZBYSA-N

Descinolone is a synthetic glucocorticoid corticosteroid which was never marketed.
