= Doxpicomine =

Chemical compound

Clinical data
- Routes of administration: Oral
- ATC code: none

Legal status
- Legal status: In general: ℞ (Prescription only)

Identifiers
- IUPAC name: 1-(1,3-dioxan-5-yl)-N,N-dimethyl-1-pyridin-3-ylmethanamine
- CAS Number: 62904-71-6; HCl: 69494-04-8
- PubChem CID: 71587215
- ChemSpider: 64983
- UNII: 9821373UA1; HCl: 27DYG0QPCR
- KEGG: D03900

Chemical and physical data
- Formula: C_{12}H_{18}N_{2}O_{2}
- Molar mass: 222.288 g·mol^{−1}
- 3D model (JSmol): Interactive image
- SMILES: CN(C)C(C1COCOC1)C2=CN=CC=C2
- InChI: InChI=1S/C12H18N2O2/c1-14(2)12(10-4-3-5-13-6-10)11-7-15-9-16-8-11/h3-6,11-12H,7-9H2,1-2H3; Key:SMZVRZPJXBGNFT-UHFFFAOYSA-N

Doxpicomine (Doxpicodin, Doxpizodine) is a mild opioid analgesic drug. The drug acts as a mu-opioid receptor agonist. It is of fairly low potency, with a 400 mg dose of doxpicomine approximately equivalent in pain-killing effect to 8 mg morphine or 100 mg pethidine. It has been used as a lead compound to derive further analogues, although all compounds in this family are comparatively weak mu agonists.
