= Terbinafine/betamethasone acetate =

Veterinary medication

Combination of
- Terbinafine: Antifungal
- Betamethasone acetate: Glucocorticosteroid

Clinical data
- Trade names: Duotic
- License data: US DailyMed: Terbinafine and betamethasone acetate
- Routes of administration: Ear drop
- ATCvet code: QS02CA90 (WHO)

Legal status
- Legal status: US: ℞-only

Terbinafine/betamethasone acetate, sold under the brand name Duotic is a veterinary medication used for the treatment of otitis externa (ear infections) in dogs. It is a fixed dose combination of terbinafine, an antifungal; and betamethasone acetate, a glucocorticosteroid anti-inflammatory.

The combination is the first FDA-approved animal drug intended to treat yeast-only otitis externa in dogs. It is also the first otic drug intended to treat otitis externa that does not contain an antibiotic.

Terbinafine/betamethasone acetate was approved for medical use in the United States in March 2024.

== Society and culture ==
=== Legal status ===
In October 2024, the Committee for Veterinary Medicinal Products of the European Medicines Agency adopted a positive opinion, recommending the granting of a marketing authorization for the veterinary medicinal product Duotic, Ear gel, intended for dogs. The applicant for this veterinary medicinal product is Dechra Regulatory B.V. The combination was authorized for veterinary use in the European Union in November 2024.

== Veterinary uses ==
Terbinafine/betamethasone acetate is indicated for the treatment of otitis externa in dogs, associated with susceptible strains of yeast (Malassezia pachydermatis).
