= Dupracetam =

Chemical compound

Clinical data
- ATC code: none

Legal status
- Legal status: In general: unscheduled

Identifiers
- IUPAC name: 2-(2-oxopyrrolidin-1-yl)-N'-[2-(2-oxopyrrolidin-1-yl)acetyl]acetohydrazide
- CAS Number: 59776-90-8
- PubChem CID: 68793
- ChemSpider: 62033
- UNII: BVM2UGN450
- ChEMBL: ChEMBL2104359
- CompTox Dashboard (EPA): DTXSID40975187
- ECHA InfoCard: 100.056.279

Chemical and physical data
- Formula: C_{12}H_{18}N_{4}O_{4}
- Molar mass: 282.300 g·mol^{−1}
- 3D model (JSmol): Interactive image
- SMILES: C1CC(=O)N(C1)CC(=O)NNC(=O)CN2CCCC2=O
- InChI: InChI=1S/C12H18N4O4/c17-9(7-15-5-1-3-11(15)19)13-14-10(18)8-16-6-2-4-12(16)20/h1-8H2,(H,13,17)(H,14,18); Key:YPUPYVWSTBYCBY-UHFFFAOYSA-N

Dupracetam is a nootropic drug from the racetam family.

One of its metabolites, 1-Methylhydantoin, displays renal toxicity in high doses.

== See also ==
- Piracetam
