= Drozitumab =

Monoclonal antibody

Monoclonal antibody
- Type: Whole antibody
- Source: Human
- Target: DR5

Clinical data
- ATC code: none

Identifiers
- CAS Number: 912628-39-8
- ChemSpider: none
- UNII: SQ67484MA7
- KEGG: D09888

Chemical and physical data
- Formula: C_{6334}H_{9792}N_{1700}O_{2000}S_{42}
- Molar mass: 143104.43 g·mol^{−1}

Drozitumab is a human monoclonal antibody in development for the treatment of cancers. It targets Tumour Necrosis Factor Related Apoptosis-inducing Ligand (TRAIL), whose receptors are found on the surface of many types of malignant cells. Drozitumab was developed by Genentech.

Although drozitumab was studied in phase II trials for treating chondrosarcoma, colorectal cancer, non-Hodgkin lymphoma, and non-small cell lung cancer, development has been halted due to lack of clinical response.
