= Dexelvucitabine =

Names
- IUPAC name 2′,3′-Didehydro-2′,3′-dideoxy-5-fluorocytidine
- Systematic IUPAC name 4-Amino-5-fluoro-1-[(2R,5S)-5-(hydroxymethyl)-2,5-dihydrofuran-1-yl]pyrimidin-2(1H)-one
- Other names Reverset

Identifiers
CAS Number	134379-77-4
3D model (JSmol)	Interactive image
ChEMBL	ChEMBL109831
ChemSpider	58498
KEGG	D03981
PubChem CID	64973
UNII	KU8SPJ271W
CompTox Dashboard (EPA)	DTXSID20158678
- InChI: InChI=1S/C9H10FN3O3/c10-6-3-13(9(15)12-8(6)11)7-2-1-5(4-14)16-7/h1-3,5,7,14H,4H2,(H2,11,12,15)/t5-,7+/m0/s1 Key: HSBKFSPNDWWPSL-CAHLUQPWSA-N; InChI=1/C9H10FN3O3/c10-6-3-13(9(15)12-8(6)11)7-2-1-5(4-14)16-7/h1-3,5,7,14H,4H2,(H2,11,12,15)/t5-,7+/m0/s1 Key: HSBKFSPNDWWPSL-CAHLUQPWBD
- SMILES: F\C1=C\N(C(=O)\N=C1\N)[C@@H]/2O[C@@H](\C=C\2)CO

Properties
Chemical formula	C_{9}H_{10}FN_{3}O_{3}
Molar mass	227.195 g·mol^{−1}
- Except where otherwise noted, data are given for materials in their standard state (at 25 °C [77 °F], 100 kPa). verify (what is ?) Infobox references

Dexelvucitabine is a failed experimental agent for the management of human immunodeficiency virus infection. It is a cytidine nucleoside analog and nucleoside reverse transcriptase inhibitor. that inhibits HIV-1 replication in vitro. During phase II clinical trials there was some indication of a decreased mean viral load in patients with infected human immunodeficiency virus.

On April 3, 2006, Pharmasset and Incyte, the pharmaceutical companies developing dexelvucitabine, announced the decision to cease further trials and development of the drug due to an increased incidence of grade 4 hyperlipasemia (an excess of the pancreatic enzyme lipase in the bloodstream) in a phase II trial.
