= Darodipine =

Names
- Preferred IUPAC name Diethyl 4-(2,1,3-benzoxadiazol-4-yl)-2,6-dimethyl-1,4-dihydropyridine-3,5-dicarboxylate
- Other names 4-(2,1,3-Benzoxadiazol-7-yl)-2,6-dimethyl-1,4-dihydropyridine-3,5-dicarboxylic acid diethyl ester

Identifiers
CAS Number	72803-02-2
3D model (JSmol)	Interactive image
ChEMBL	ChEMBL2104154
ChemSpider	46790
PubChem CID	51701
UNII	N4AL7X96GL
CompTox Dashboard (EPA)	DTXSID90223125
- InChI: InChI=1/C19H21N3O5/c1-5-25-18(23)14-10(3)20-11(4)15(19(24)26-6-2)16(14)12-8-7-9-13-17(12)22-27-21-13/h7-9,16,20H,5-6H2,1-4H3 Key: QERUYFVNIOLCHV-UHFFFAOYAW
- SMILES: O=C(OCC)\C3=C(\N\C(=C(\C(=O)OCC)C3c1cccc2nonc12)C)C

Properties
Chemical formula	C_{19}H_{21}N_{3}O_{5}
Molar mass	371.393 g·mol^{−1}
- Except where otherwise noted, data are given for materials in their standard state (at 25 °C [77 °F], 100 kPa). Infobox references

Darodipine is an experimental calcium channel blocker that based on animal models may reduce neuronal cytoskeletal alterations during aging and in neurodegenerative disorders. Studies performed on rats have shown darodipine to have an effect on brain serotonergic systems. Darodipine increased the 5-HIAA/5-HT ratio within various parts of the brain. Darodipine has also been shown to impair memory and learning processes on mice.

The longterm effect of darodipine was tested in the rats and it shows that there is no significant change in their body and brain weight values but, there is a significant change in their alkaline phosphate reactive capillary profile values. Alkaline phosphate enzymes plays an important role in the functioning of the cerebral capillary activities. The effect of darodipine on plasma concentration was also tested on a group of healthy male human volunteers. The result showed that darodipine resulted in the change in heart rate and diastolic blood pressure which is related to the plasma concentration.

Darodipine (50–500 nM), the sensitivity of DMPO‐COO.− adduct decreased by more than that of the DMPO‐OH adduct and the concentration-dependent drop in signal intensity. It has additional preventive effects, because of its calcium antagonistics, against free-radical mediated electrophysiological alterations; it is likely because of the trapping of such radical molecules.

== See also ==
- Isradipine, a structural isomer of darodipine
