= Devapamil =

Names
- IUPAC name (RS)-2-(3,4-dimethoxyphenyl)-2-isopropyl-5-[2-(3-methoxyphenyl)ethyl-methylamino]pentanenitrile

Identifiers
CAS Number	92302-55-1
3D model (JSmol)	Interactive image
ChEBI	CHEBI:34673
ChEMBL	ChEMBL2074792
ChemSpider	59244
PubChem CID	65832
UNII	M6142PTV7J
CompTox Dashboard (EPA)	DTXSID60869094
- InChI: InChI=1/C26H36N2O3/c1-20(2)26(19-27,22-11-12-24(30-5)25(18-22)31-6)14-8-15-28(3)16-13-21-9-7-10-23(17-21)29-4/h7,9-12,17-18,20H,8,13-16H2,1-6H3 Key: VMVKIDPOEOLUFS-UHFFFAOYAV
- SMILES: N#CC(c1cc(OC)c(OC)cc1)(CCCN(CCc2cccc(OC)c2)C)C(C)C

Properties
Chemical formula	C_{26}H_{36}N_{2}O_{3}
Molar mass	424.585 g·mol^{−1}
- Except where otherwise noted, data are given for materials in their standard state (at 25 °C [77 °F], 100 kPa). Infobox references

Devapamil is a calcium channel blocker. It is also known as desmethoxyverapamil, which is a phenylalkylamine (PAA) derivative. Devapamil not only inhibits by blocking the calcium gated channels, but also by depolarizing the membrane during the sodium-potassium exchanges.

== Structure ==
Devapamil consists of two aromatic rings with methoxy substituents connected by an alkylamine chain increasing flexibility and overall potency.

== Animal studies ==
Devapamil in rats can be used to decrease glutathione levels and increase oxidation of lipids, which makes it effective in preclusion of ulcers caused by stress. The medical characteristics of this drug, and other phenylalkylamines, depends greatly on the state of the calcium channels being targeted which results in a greater affinity and drug efficiency.
