= Domoprednate =

Chemical compound

Clinical data
- Trade names: Stermonid
- Other names: Ro 12-7024; 11β-Hydroxy-D-homopregna-1,4-diene-3,20-dione 17α-butyrate
- Routes of administration: Topical
- Drug class: Corticosteroid; Glucocorticoid

Identifiers
- IUPAC name: [(1R,4aS,4bS,10aR,10bS,11S,12aS)-1-Acetyl-11-hydroxy-10a,12a-dimethyl-8-oxo-2,3,4,4a,4b,5,6,10b,11,12-decahydrochrysen-1-yl] butanoate
- CAS Number: 66877-67-6
- PubChem CID: 68868
- ChemSpider: 62100
- UNII: 910G0QIM2M
- ChEMBL: ChEMBL2106538
- CompTox Dashboard (EPA): DTXSID801024405
- ECHA InfoCard: 100.060.441

Chemical and physical data
- Formula: C_{26}H_{36}O_{5}
- Molar mass: 428.569 g·mol^{−1}
- 3D model (JSmol): Interactive image
- SMILES: CCCC(=O)O[C@@]1(CCC[C@@H]2[C@@]1(C[C@@H]([C@H]3[C@H]2CCC4=CC(=O)C=C[C@]34C)O)C)C(=O)C
- InChI: InChI=1S/C26H36O5/c1-5-7-22(30)31-26(16(2)27)12-6-8-20-19-10-9-17-14-18(28)11-13-24(17,3)23(19)21(29)15-25(20,26)4/h11,13-14,19-21,23,29H,5-10,12,15H2,1-4H3/t19-,20-,21-,23+,24-,25-,26-/m0/s1; Key:IYBYNRHXGXDDDS-VRRJBYJJSA-N

Domoprednate (brand name Stermonid; developmental code name Ro 12-7024) is a synthetic glucocorticoid corticosteroid which was developed in the late 1970s and 1980s.
