= Dexpramipexole =

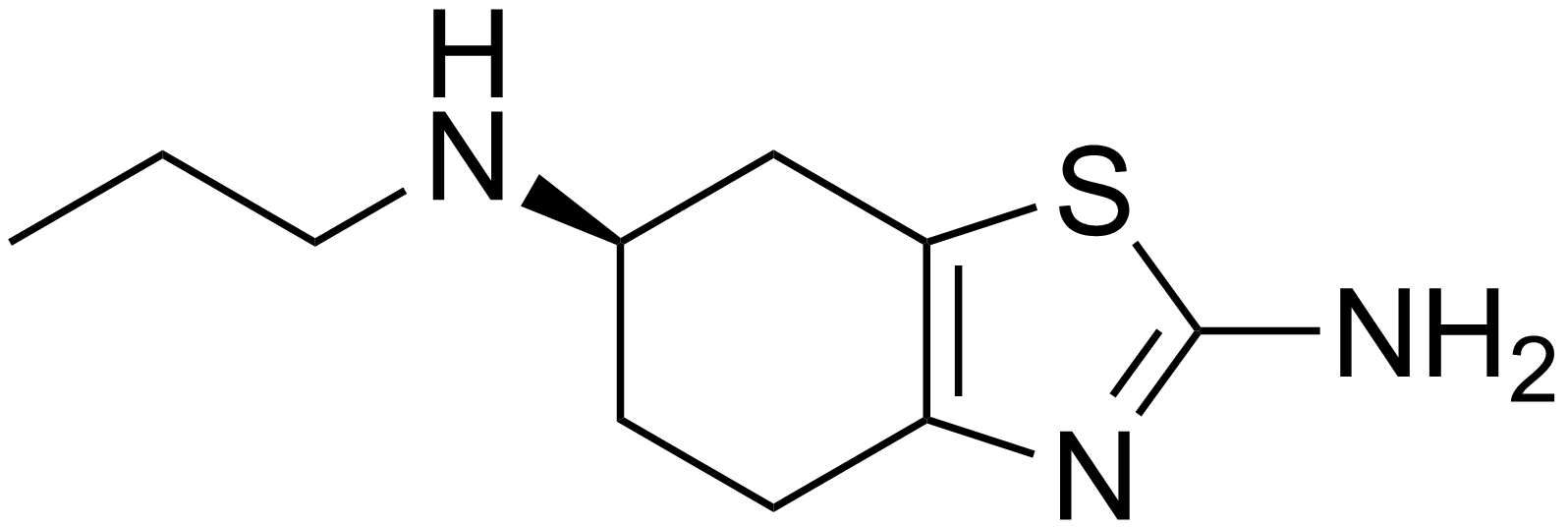

Names
- Preferred IUPAC name (6R)-N^{6}-Propyl-4,5,6,7-tetrahydro-1,3-benzothiazole-2,6-diamine

Identifiers
CAS Number	104632-28-2; 104632-27-1 (Dihydrochloride)
3D model (JSmol)	Interactive image
ChEMBL	ChEMBL249420
ChemSpider	54002
KEGG	D09886
PubChem CID	59868
UNII	WI638GUS96; I9038PKO43 (Dihydrochloride)
CompTox Dashboard (EPA)	DTXSID50146624
- InChI: InChI=1S/C10H17N3S/c1-2-5-12-7-3-4-8-9(6-7)14-10(11)13-8/h7,12H,2-6H2,1H3,(H2,11,13)/t7-/m1/s1 Key: FASDKYOPVNHBLU-SSDOTTSWSA-N; InChI=1/C10H17N3S/c1-2-5-12-7-3-4-8-9(6-7)14-10(11)13-8/h7,12H,2-6H2,1H3,(H2,11,13)/t7-/m1/s1 Key: FASDKYOPVNHBLU-SSDOTTSWBR
- SMILES: CCCN[C@@H]1CCC(N=C(N)S2)=C2C1

Properties
Chemical formula	C_{10}H_{17}N_{3}S
Molar mass	211.33 g·mol^{−1}
- Except where otherwise noted, data are given for materials in their standard state (at 25 °C [77 °F], 100 kPa). verify (what is ?) Infobox references

== About ==
Dexpramipexole is a first-in-class oral investigational medicine that lowers blood and tissue eosinophils before they can cause damage in the target organ. Dexpramipexole is being developed by Areteia Therapeutics and has the potential to be the first oral treatment ever approved for eosinophilic asthma.

The eosinophil-targeting effects of oral dexpramipexole were discovered during its clinical development. Across five clinical trials, dexpramipexole has consistently been shown to significantly reduce blood eosinophil counts.

== Recent data ==
The most recently completed dexpramipexole clinical trial was EXHALE-1 (AS201), a Phase II clinical trial in participants with moderate-to-severe eosinophilic asthma. Dexpramipexole demonstrated highly significant, dose dependent eosinophil lowering during the primary assessment phase and was maximal at Week 12. Dexpramipexole produced clinically relevant changes in FEV_{1} across study arms and time points and the magnitude of FEV_{1} improvement was comparable to currently approved biologics. Dexpramipexole was well tolerated in the trial, with adverse events balanced across treatment and placebo groups, no serious adverse events, and no adverse events leading to discontinuation.

== Phase III Development Underway ==
Areteia Therapeutics is currently conducting three global Phase III clinical trials of dexpramipexole in eosinophil-associated asthma as listed below.

EXHALE-2: a global Phase III clinical trial to evaluate the efficacy and safety of dexpramipexole as an add-on oral therapy in participants with inadequately controlled eosinophilic asthma, is currently recruiting people ≥12 years old with a documented physician diagnosis of asthma who require medium to high dose inhaled corticosteroids with at least one other controller medicine and a history of asthma exacerbations. The study will assess the effects of two different doses of dexpramipexole on exacerbation rates and lung function.

EXHALE-3: a global Phase III clinical trial to evaluate the efficacy and safety of dexpramipexole as an add-on oral therapy in participants with inadequately controlled eosinophilic asthma, is currently recruiting people ≥12 years old with a documented physician diagnosis of asthma who require medium to high dose inhaled corticosteroids with at least one other controller medicine and a history of asthma exacerbations. The study will assess the effects of two different doses of dexpramipexole on exacerbation rates and lung function.

EXHALE-4: a global Phase III clinical trial to evaluate dexpramipexole as an add-on oral therapy in participants with inadequately controlled eosinophilic asthma, is currently recruiting people ≥12 years old with a documented physician diagnosis of asthma who require treatment with at least low-dose inhaled corticosteroids and one other controller medicine. The study will assess improvements in lung function, asthma control, and quality of life.

== History ==
Dexpramipexole was originally identified as a candidate therapy for amyotrophic lateral sclerosis (ALS), also known as Lou Gehrig's disease by James Bennett, M.D., Ph.D., then of the University of Virginia.

The drug was initially investigated in ALS by Knopp Biosciences and Biogen Idec. A 2010 Phase II clinical trial showed a slowing of ALS disease progression and mortality benefits. In January 2013, Biogen Idec discontinued its development of dexpramipexole in ALS due to lack of efficacy in the Phase III study.

As a result of observing eosinophil lowering in the ALS trials, Knopp pivoted dexpramipexole clinical development to eosinophil associated diseases. In subsequent clinical trials, dexpramipexole significantly reduced eosinophil counts and glucocorticoid requirements in patients with hypereosinophilic syndrome and significantly reduced blood and tissue eosinophil counts in patients with chronic rhinosinusitis with nasal polyps.

== Chemical structure and Pharmacology ==
Dexpramipexole is the (D)-enantiomer of pramipexole. Enantiopure dexpramipexole has essentially no dopamine agonist activity and shares no other pharmacologic similarity to pramipexole. In contrast, pramipexole the (S)-enantiomer is a dopamine agonist and is an approved drug (Mirapex) used in Parkinson's disease.

Dexpramipexole is a low molecular weight, orally bioavailable, water-soluble small molecule with linear pharmacokinetics and linear dose proportionality.
