= Antihistamine =

Drug that blocks histamine or histamine agonists

- Drug class
- Histamine structure

Class identifiers
- Pronunciation: /ˌæntiˈhɪstəmiːn/
- ATC code: R06
- Mechanism of action: • Receptor antagonist • Inverse agonist
- Biological target: Histamine receptors • HRH1 • HRH2 • HRH3 • HRH4

External links
- MeSH: D006633

Legal status

Antihistamines are drugs that counteract the effects of histamine in the body, such as allergies and gastrointestinal conditions. Typically, people take antihistamines as an inexpensive, generic (not patented) drug that can be bought without a prescription and provides relief from nasal congestion, sneezing, or hives caused by pollen, dust mites, or animal allergy with few side effects. Antihistamines are usually for short-term treatment. Chronic allergies increase the risk of health problems which antihistamines might not treat, including asthma, sinusitis, and lower respiratory tract infection. Consultation of a medical professional is recommended for those who intend to take antihistamines for longer-term use.

Although the general public typically uses the word "antihistamine" to describe drugs for treating allergies, physicians and scientists use the term to describe a class of drug that opposes the activity of histamine receptors in the body. In this sense of the word, antihistamines are subclassified according to the histamine receptor that they act upon. The two largest classes of antihistamines are H_{1}-antihistamines and H_{2}-antihistamines.

H_{1}-antihistamines work by binding to histamine H_{1} receptors in mast cells, smooth muscle, and endothelium in the body as well as in the tuberomammillary nucleus in the brain. Antihistamines that target the histamine H_{1}-receptor are used to treat allergic reactions in the nose (e.g., itching, runny nose, and sneezing). In addition, they may be used to treat insomnia, motion sickness, or vertigo caused by problems with the inner ear. H_{2}-antihistamines bind to histamine H_{2} receptors in the upper gastrointestinal tract, primarily in the stomach. Antihistamines that target the histamine H_{2}-receptor are used to treat gastric acid conditions (e.g., peptic ulcers and acid reflux). Other antihistamines also target H_{3} receptors and H_{4} receptors.

Histamine receptors exhibit constitutive activity, so antihistamines can function as either a neutral receptor antagonist or an inverse agonist at histamine receptors. Only a few currently marketed H_{1}-antihistamines are known to function as antagonists.

== Medical uses ==
Histamine makes blood vessels more permeable (vascular permeability), causing fluid to escape from capillaries into tissues, which leads to the classic symptoms of an allergic reaction—a runny nose and watery eyes. Histamine also promotes angiogenesis.

Antihistamines suppress the histamine-induced wheal response (swelling) and flare response (vasodilation) by blocking the binding of histamine to its receptors or reducing histamine receptor activity on nerves, vascular smooth muscle, glandular cells, endothelium, and mast cells. Antihistamines can also help correct Eustachian Tube dysfunction, thereby helping correct problems such as muffled hearing, fullness in the ear and even tinnitus.

Itching, sneezing, and inflammatory responses are suppressed by antihistamines that act on H1-receptors. In 2014, antihistamines such as desloratadine were found to be effective to complement standardized treatment of acne due to their anti-inflammatory properties and their ability to suppress sebum production.

== Types ==
=== H_{1}-antihistamines ===
H_{1}-antihistamines refer to compounds that inhibit the activity of the H_{1} receptor. Since the H_{1} receptor exhibits constitutive activity, H_{1}-antihistamines can be either neutral receptor antagonists or inverse agonists. Normally, histamine binds to the H_{1} receptor and heightens the receptor's activity; the receptor antagonists work by binding to the receptor and blocking the activation of the receptor by histamine; by comparison, the inverse agonists bind to the receptor and both block the binding of histamine, and reduce its constitutive activity, an effect which is opposite to histamine's. Most antihistamines are inverse agonists at the H_{1} receptor, but it was previously thought that they were antagonists.

Clinically, H_{1}-antihistamines are used to treat allergic reactions and mast cell-related disorders. Sedation is a common side effect of H_{1}-antihistamines that readily cross the blood–brain barrier; some of these drugs, such as diphenhydramine and doxylamine, may therefore be used to treat insomnia. H_{1}-antihistamines can also reduce inflammation, since the expression of NF-κB, the transcription factor that regulates inflammatory processes, is promoted by both the receptor's constitutive activity and agonist (i.e., histamine) binding at the H_{1} receptor.

A combination of these effects, and in some cases metabolic ones as well, leads to most first-generation antihistamines having analgesic-sparing (potentiating) effects on opioid analgesics and to some extent with non-opioid ones as well. The most common antihistamines utilized for this purpose include hydroxyzine, promethazine, phenyltoloxamine, orphenadrine, and tripelennamine; some may also have intrinsic analgesic properties of their own, orphenadrine being an example.

Second-generation antihistamines cross the blood–brain barrier to a much lesser extent than the first-generation antihistamines. They minimize sedatory effects due to their focused effect on peripheral histamine receptors. However, with high doses, second-generation antihistamines begin to act on the central nervous system and thus can induce drowsiness when ingested in higher quantities.

==== List of H_{1} antagonists/inverse agonists ====
- Acrivastine
- Alimemazine (a phenothiazine used as antipruritic, antiemetic and sedative)
- Amitriptyline (tricyclic antidepressant)
- Amoxapine (tricyclic antidepressant)
- Aripiprazole (atypical antipsychotic, trade name: Abilify)
- Brexpiprazole (atypical antipsychotic, trade name: Rexulti)
- Azelastine
- Bilastine
- Bromodiphenhydramine (Bromazine)
- Brompheniramine
- Buclizine
- Carbinoxamine
- Cetirizine (Zyrtec)
- Chlophedianol (Clofedanol)
- Chlorodiphenhydramine
- Chlorpheniramine
- Chlorpromazine (low-potency typical antipsychotic, also used as an antiemetic)
- Chlorprothixene (low-potency typical antipsychotic, trade name: Truxal)
- Chloropyramine (first generation antihistamine marketed in Eastern Europe)
- Cinnarizine (also used for motion sickness and vertigo)
- Clemastine
- Clomipramine (tricyclic antidepressant)
- Clozapine (atypical antipsychotic; trade name: Clozaril)
- Cyclizine
- Cyproheptadine
- Desloratadine
- Dexbrompheniramine
- Dexchlorpheniramine
- Dimenhydrinate (used as an antiemetic and for motion sickness)
- Dimetindene
- Diphenhydramine (Benadryl)
- Dosulepin (tricyclic antidepressant)
- Doxepin (tricyclic antidepressant)
- Doxylamine (most commonly used as an over-the-counter sedative)
- Ebastine
- Embramine
- Fexofenadine (Allegra/Telfast)
- Fluoxetine
- Hydroxyzine (also used as an anxiolytic and for motion sickness; trade names: Atarax, Vistaril)
- Imipramine (tricyclic antidepressant)
- Ketotifen
- Levocabastine (Livostin/Livocab)
- Levocetirizine (Xyzal)
- Levomepromazine (low-potency typical antipsychotic)
- Loratadine (Claritin)
- Maprotiline (tetracyclic antidepressant)
- Meclizine (most commonly used as an antiemetic)
- Mianserin (tetracyclic antidepressant)
- Mirtazapine (tetracyclic antidepressant, also has antiemetic and appetite-stimulating effects; trade name: Remeron)
- Olanzapine (atypical antipsychotic; trade name: Zyprexa)
- Olopatadine (used locally)
- Orphenadrine (a close relative of diphenhydramine used mainly as a skeletal muscle relaxant and anti-Parkinsons agent)
- Periciazine (low-potency typical antipsychotic)
- Phenindamine
- Pheniramine
- Phenyltoloxamine
- Promethazine (Phenergan)
- Pyrilamine (crosses the blood–brain barrier; produces drowsiness)
- Quetiapine (atypical antipsychotic; trade name: Seroquel)
- Rupatadine (Alergoliber)
- Setastine (Loderix)
- Setiptiline (or teciptiline, a tetracyclic antidepressant, trade name: Tecipul)
- Trazodone (SARI antidepressant/anxiolytic/hypnotic with mild H_{1} blockade action)
- Tripelennamine
- Triprolidine

=== H_{2}-antihistamines ===
H_{2}-antihistamines, like H_{1}-antihistamines, exist as inverse agonists and neutral antagonists. They act on H_{2} histamine receptors found mainly in the parietal cells of the gastric mucosa, which are part of the endogenous signaling pathway for gastric acid secretion. Normally, histamine acts on H_{2} to stimulate acid secretion; drugs that inhibit H_{2} signaling thus reduce the secretion of gastric acid.

H_{2}-antihistamines are among the first-line therapy to treat gastrointestinal conditions, including peptic ulcers and gastroesophageal reflux disease. Some formulations are available over the counter. Most side effects are due to cross-reactivity with unintended receptors. Cimetidine, for example, is notorious for antagonizing androgenic testosterone and DHT receptors at high doses.

Examples include:

- Cimetidine
- Famotidine
- Lafutidine
- Nizatidine
- Ranitidine
- Roxatidine
- Tiotidine

=== H_{3}-antihistamines ===
An H_{3}-antihistamine is a classification of drugs used to inhibit the action of histamine at the H_{3} receptor. H_{3} receptors are primarily found in the brain and are inhibitory autoreceptors located on histaminergic nerve terminals, which modulate the release of histamine. Histamine release in the brain triggers secondary release of excitatory neurotransmitters such as glutamate and acetylcholine via stimulation of H_{1} receptors in the cerebral cortex. Consequently, unlike the H_{1}-antihistamines which are sedating, H_{3}-antihistamines have stimulant and cognition-modulating effects.

Examples of selective H_{3}-antihistamines include:

- Clobenpropit
- ABT-239
- Ciproxifan
- Conessine
- A-349,821.
- Thioperamide

=== H_{4}-antihistamines ===
H_{4}-antihistamines inhibit the activity of the H_{4} receptor. Examples include:

- Thioperamide
- JNJ 7777120
- VUF-6002

Histamine receptors
Receptor	Location	Mechanism of action	Function	Antagonists	Uses of antagonists
H_{1}	Throughout the body, especially in: Smooth muscles; vascular endothelial cells (cells of walls of blood vessels); adrenal medulla; heart; brain; spinal cord	G_{q}	ileum contraction; modulate circadian cycle; itching; systemic vasodilatation (indirect effect throughout the increased production of NO); bronchoconstriction (allergy-induced asthma)	H_{1}-receptor antagonists; Azelastine; Diphenhydramine; Loratadine; Cetirizine; Fexofenadine; Clemastine; Rupatadine	Allergies; nausea; sleep disorders
H_{2}	Gastric parietal cells; smooth muscles; mast cells; neutrophils; heart; uterus	G_{s} ↑ cAMP^{2+}	speed up sinus rhythm; Stimulation of gastric acid secretion; Smooth muscle relaxation; Inhibit antibody synthesis, T-cell proliferation and cytokine production	H_{2}-receptor antagonists; Ranitidine; Cimetidine; Famotidine; Nizatidine	Peptic ulcer disease; Stress ulcers; Gastroesophageal reflux disease; Dyspepsia; Aspiration pneumonia
H_{3}	Thalamus; caudate nucleus; cerebral cortex; small intestine; testes; prostate	G_{i}	Decrease Acetylcholine, Serotonin and Norepinephrine Neurotransmitter release in CNS; Presynaptic autoreceptors	H_{3}-receptor antagonists; ABT-239; Ciproxifan; Clobenpropit; Thioperamide	Narcolepsy; Alzheimer's disease; Attention deficit hyperactivity disorder (ADHD); Schizophrenia
H_{4}	Immune system; lymphocytes; leukocytes; Lymphoid organs; thymus; spleen; liver; gastrointestinal tract (GIT); pancreas; bile ducts	G_{i}	mediate mast cell chemotaxis.	H_{4}-receptor antagonists; Thioperamide; JNJ 7777120	As of July 2021, no clinical uses exist. Potential uses include: rheumatoid arthritis; asthma; allergic rhinitis; atopic dermatitis; pruritus

== Chemical structure ==
=== H_{1}-antihistamines ===
H_{1}-antihistamines are mainly used to treat allergy or other types of inflammatory processes related to IgE production. Most drugs from this class act as histamine inverse agonists rather than neutral antagonists, which means they decrease the constitutive activity of the histamine receptor below its basal level.

This activity is closely related to the general chemical structure of H_{1}-antihistamines:

- One aromatic group (such as a phenyl, substituted phenyl, thienyl, or pyridyl), that mimics hitamine's imidazole group;
- A second aromatic group, which provides extra affinity to the receptor;
- A spacer, which is usually a short chain of two or three carbons;
- An end amine group, typically a tertiary aliphatic amine with simple alkyl substituents, that mimics hitamine's end amine group.

General structure of H_{1}-antihistamines.

From there, you can classify almost any first-generation H_{1}-antihistamine:

Structural Classification of H_{1}-Antihistamines
Generation	Chemical Class	X group	Spacer	R_{1}	R_{2}	Examples	
1st-generation antihistamines	Ethylenediamines	N	-(CH_{2})_{n}-	CH_{3}	CH_{3}	Phenbenzamine.	Methapyrilene
1st-generation antihistamines	Ethanolamine ethers	CHO	-(CH_{2})_{n}-	CH_{3}	CH_{3}	Clemastine	Diphenhydramine
1st-generation antihistamines	Alkyl amines	CH or C=C	-(CH_{2})_{n}-	CH_{3}	CH_{3}	Pheniramine	Chlorphenamine
1st-generation antihistamines	Piperazines	CH	Incorporated into a piperazine ring		Alkyl or aralkyl group	Hydroxyzine	Cyclizine
1st-generation antihistamines	Tricyclics	N or C=C	Branched 2–3 carbon chain	CH_{3}	CH_{3}	Cyproheptadine	Promethazine
2nd-generation antihistamines	Various	Various	Various	Various	Various	Fexofenadine, a 2nd generation antihistamine.	

== Atypical antihistamines ==
=== Histidine decarboxylase inhibitors ===
Inhibit the action of histidine decarboxylase:

- Tritoqualine
- Catechin

=== Mast cell stabilizers ===
Mast cell stabilizers are drugs which prevent mast cell degranulation. Examples include:

- Cromolyn sodium
- Nedocromil
- β-agonists

== History ==
The first H_{1} receptor antagonists were discovered in the 1930s and were marketed in the 1940s. Piperoxan was discovered in 1933 and was the first compound with antihistamine effects to be identified. Piperoxan and its analogues were too toxic to be used in humans. Phenbenzamine (Antergan) was the first clinically useful antihistamine and was introduced for medical use in 1942. Subsequently, many other antihistamines were developed and marketed. Diphenhydramine (Benadryl) was synthesized in 1943, tripelennamine (Pyribenzamine) was patented in 1946, and promethazine (Phenergan) was synthesized in 1947 and launched in 1949. By 1950, at least 20 antihistamines had been marketed. Chlorphenamine (Piriton), a less sedating antihistamine, was synthesized in 1951, and hydroxyzine (Atarax, Vistaril), an antihistamine used specifically as a sedative and tranquilizer, was developed in 1956. The first non-sedating antihistamine was terfenadine (Seldane) and was developed in 1973. Subsequently, other non-sedating antihistamines like loratadine (Claritin), cetirizine (Zyrtec), and fexofenadine (Allegra) were developed and introduced.

The introduction of the first-generation antihistamines marked the beginning of medical treatment of nasal allergies. Research into these drugs led to the discovery that they were H_{1} receptor antagonists and also to the development of H_{2} receptor antagonists, where H_{1}-antihistamines affected the nose and the H_{2}-antihistamines affected the stomach. This history has led to contemporary research into drugs which are H_{3} receptor antagonists and which affect the H_{4} receptor antagonists. Most people who use an H_{1} receptor antagonist to treat allergies use a second-generation drug.

== Society and culture ==
The United States government removed two second-generation antihistamines, terfenadine and astemizole, from the market based on evidence that they could cause heart problems.

== Research ==
Not much published research exists that compares the efficacy and safety of the various antihistamines available. The research that does exist is mostly short-term studies or studies that look at too few people to make general assumptions. Another gap in the research is in information reporting the health effects for individuals with long-term allergies who take antihistamines for a long period. Newer antihistamines have been demonstrated to be effective in treating hives. However, there is no research comparing the relative efficacy of these drugs.

=== Special populations ===
In 2020, the UK National Health Service wrote that "[m]ost people can safely take antihistamines" but that "[s]ome antihistamines may not be suitable" for young children, the pregnant or breastfeeding, for those taking other medicines, or people with conditions "such as heart disease, liver disease, kidney disease or epilepsy".

Most studies of antihistamines reported on younger people, so the effects on people over age 65 are not as well understood. Older people are more likely to experience drowsiness from antihistamine use than younger people. Continuous and/or cumulative use of anticholinergic medications, including first-generation antihistamines, is associated with a higher risk for cognitive decline and dementia in older people.

Also, most of the research has been on Caucasians, and other ethnic groups are not as well-represented in the research. The evidence does not report how antihistamines affect women differently than men. Different studies have reported on antihistamine use in children, with various studies finding evidence that certain antihistamines could be used by children 2 years of age, and other drugs being safer for younger or older children.

=== Potential uses studied ===
Research regarding the effects of commonly used medications upon certain cancer therapies has suggested that when consumed in conjunction with immune checkpoint inhibitors, some may influence the response of subjects to that particular treatment, whose T-cell functions were failing in anti-tumor activity. Upon study of records in mouse studies associated with 40 common medications ranging from antibiotics, antihistamines, aspirin, and hydrocortisone, that for subjects with melanoma and lung cancers, fexofenadine, one of three medications, along with loratadine, and cetirizine, that target histamine receptor H1 (HRH1), demonstrated significantly higher survival rates and had experienced restored T-cell anti-tumor activity, ultimately inhibiting tumor growth in the subject animals. Such results encourage further study to see whether results in humans is similar in combating resistance to immunotherapy.

== See also ==
- Antileukotriene
- Immunotherapy
