= Histamine receptor =

Class of receptor proteins that bind histamine

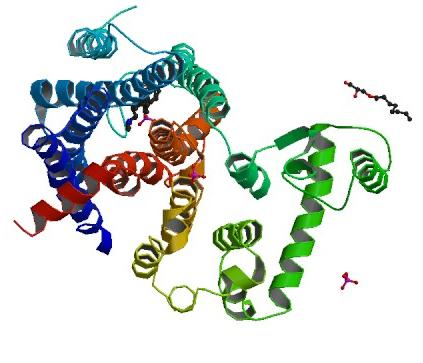
The structure of histamine H1 receptor

The histamine receptors are a class of G protein–coupled receptors which bind histamine as their primary endogenous ligand. Histamine is a neurotransmitter involved in various physiological processes. There are four main types of histamine receptors: H1, H2, H3, and H4. H1 receptors are linked to allergic responses, H2 to gastric acid regulation, H3 to neurotransmitter release modulation, and H4 to immune system function.

There are four known histamine receptors:

- H_{1} receptor – Primarily located on smooth muscle cells, endothelial cells, and neurons. Activation of H1 receptors mediates various responses, including smooth muscle contraction (leading to bronchoconstriction, intestinal cramping), increased vascular permeability (resulting in edema), and stimulation of sensory nerve endings (causing itching and pain). H1 antagonists, commonly known as antihistamines, are used to alleviate symptoms of allergies and allergic reactions.
- H_{2} receptor – Found mainly in the stomach lining (parietal cells), H2 receptors regulate gastric acid secretion by stimulating the production of hydrochloric acid. H2 antagonists (H2 blockers) are used to reduce stomach acid production and treat conditions like gastroesophageal reflux disease (GERD) and peptic ulcers.
- H_{3} receptor – Predominantly located in the central nervous system (CNS), particularly in regions associated with neurotransmitter release and modulation. H3 receptors act as presynaptic autoreceptors and heteroreceptors, regulating the release of neurotransmitters such as dopamine, serotonin, norepinephrine, and acetylcholine. Modulation of H3 receptors is being explored as a potential target for various neurological and psychiatric disorders.
- H_{4} receptor – Initially discovered on immune cells, particularly mast cells, eosinophils, and T cells, H4 receptors are involved in immune responses, including chemotaxis (cellular movement in response to chemical signals) and cytokine production. These receptors play a role in inflammation and allergic reactions. Research on H4 receptors is ongoing to better understand their involvement in immune-related disorders and to develop potential therapeutic interventions.

== Comparison ==
Histamine receptors
Receptor	Location	Mechanism of action	Function	Antagonists	Uses of antagonists
H_{1}	Throughout the body, especially in: Smooth muscles; vascular endothelial cells (cells of walls of blood vessels); adrenal medulla; heart; brain; spinal cord	G_{q}	ileum contraction; modulate circadian cycle; itching; systemic vasodilatation (indirect effect throughout the increased production of NO); bronchoconstriction (allergy-induced asthma)	H_{1}-receptor antagonists; Diphenhydramine; Loratadine; Cetirizine; Fexofenadine; Clemastine; Rupatadine	Allergies; nausea; sleep disorders
H_{2}	Gastric parietal cells; smooth muscles; mast cells; neutrophils; heart; uterus	G_{s} ↑ cAMP^{2+}	speed up sinus rhythm; Stimulation of gastric acid secretion; Smooth muscle relaxation; Inhibit antibody synthesis, T-cell proliferation and cytokine production	H_{2}-receptor antagonists; Ranitidine; Cimetidine; Famotidine; Nizatidine	Peptic ulcer disease; Stress ulcers; Gastroesophageal reflux disease; Dyspepsia; Aspiration pneumonia; Resistant schizophrenia
H_{3}	Thalamus; caudate nucleus; cerebral cortex; small intestine; testes; prostate	G_{i}	Decrease Acetylcholine, Serotonin and Norepinephrine Neurotransmitter release in CNS; Presynaptic autoreceptors	H_{3}-receptor antagonists; ABT-239; Ciproxifan; Clobenpropit; Thioperamide	Narcolepsy; Alzheimer's disease; Attention deficit hyperactivity disorder (ADHD); Schizophrenia
H_{4}	Immune system; lymphocytes; leukocytes; Lymphoid organs; thymus; spleen; liver; gastrointestinal tract (GIT); pancreas; bile ducts	G_{i}	mediate mast cell chemotaxis.	H_{4}-receptor antagonists; Thioperamide; JNJ 7777120	As of July 2021, no clinical uses exist. Potential uses include:f: rheumatoid arthritis; asthma; allergic rhinitis; atopic dermatitis; pruritus

There are several splice variants of H_{3} present in various species. Though all of the receptors are 7-transmembrane g protein coupled receptors, H_{1} and H_{2} are quite different from H_{3} and H_{4} in their activities. H_{1} causes an increase in PIP_{2} hydrolysis, H2 stimulates gastric acid secretion, and H3 mediates feedback inhibition of histamine.
