= H1 antagonist =

Drugs that block the action of histamine

H_{1} antagonists, also called H_{1} blockers, are a class of medications that block the action of histamine at the H_{1} receptor, helping to relieve allergic reactions. Agents where the main therapeutic effect is mediated by negative modulation of histamine receptors are termed antihistamines; other agents may have antihistaminergic action but are not true antihistamines.

In common use, the term "antihistamine" refers only to H_{1}-antihistamines. Virtually all H_{1}-antihistamines function as inverse agonists at the histamine H_{1}-receptor, as opposed to neutral antagonists, as was previously believed.

== Medical uses ==
H_{1}-antihistamines are used clinically to treat histamine-mediated allergic conditions. These indications may include:

- Allergic rhinitis
- Allergic conjunctivitis
- Allergic dermatological conditions (contact dermatitis)
- Rhinorrhea (runny nose)
- Urticaria
- Angioedema
- Diarrhea
- Pruritus (atopic dermatitis, insect bites)
- Anaphylactic or anaphylactoid reactions—adjunct only

First-generation H_{1}-antihistamines can act on the central nervous system (CNS). As a result, they are also used for:

- Nausea, vomiting, and motion sickness
- Sedation

H_{1}-antihistamines can be administered topically (through the skin, nose, or eyes) or systemically, based on the nature of the allergic condition.

The authors of the American College of Chest Physicians Updates on Cough Guidelines (2006) recommend that, for cough associated with the common cold, first-generation antihistamine-decongestants are more effective than newer, non-sedating antihistamines. First-generation antihistamines include diphenhydramine (Benadryl), carbinoxamine (Clistin), clemastine (Tavist), chlorpheniramine (Chlor-Trimeton), and brompheniramine (Dimetane). However, a 1955 study of "antihistaminic drugs for colds," carried out by the U.S. Army Medical Corps, reported that "there was no significant difference in the proportion of cures reported by patients receiving oral antihistaminic drugs and those receiving oral placebos. Furthermore, essentially the same proportion of patients reported no benefit from either type of treatment."

== Side effects ==
Adverse drug reactions are most commonly associated with the first-generation H_{1}-antihistamines. This is due to their relative lack of selectivity for the H_{1}-receptor and their ability to cross the blood–brain barrier.

The most common adverse effect is sedation; this "side-effect" is utilized in many OTC sleeping-aid preparations. Other common adverse effects in first-generation H_{1}-antihistamines include dizziness, tinnitus, blurred vision, euphoria, incoordination, anxiety, increased appetite leading to weight gain, insomnia, tremor, nausea and vomiting, constipation, diarrhea, dry mouth, and dry cough. Infrequent adverse effects include urinary retention, palpitations, hypotension, headache, hallucination, psychosis and erectile dysfunction.

The newer, second-generation H_{1}-antihistamines are far more selective for peripheral histamine H_{1}-receptors and have a better tolerability profile compared to the first-generation agents. The most common adverse effects noted for second-generation agents include drowsiness, fatigue, headache, nausea, and dry mouth.

Continuous and/or cumulative use of anticholinergic medications, including first-generation antihistamines, is associated with a higher risk for cognitive decline and dementia in older people.

== Pharmacology ==
=== Anti-allergy activity ===
In type I hypersensitivity allergic reactions, an allergen (a type of antigen) interacts with and cross-links surface IgE antibodies on mast cells and basophils. Once the allergen cross-links Immunoglobulin E, tyrosine kinases rapidly signal into the cell, leading to cell degranulation and the release of histamine (and other chemical mediators) from the mast cell or basophil. Once released, the histamine can react with local or widespread tissues through histamine receptors.

Histamine, acting on H_{1}-receptors, produces pruritus, vasodilation, hypotension, flushing, headache, bradycardia, bronchoconstriction, increase in vascular permeability and potentiation of pain.

While H_{1}-antihistamines help against these effects, they work only if taken before contact with the allergen. In severe allergies, such as anaphylaxis or angioedema, these effects may be of life-threatening severity. Additional administration of epinephrine, often in the form of an autoinjector, is required by people with such hypersensitivities.

=== Sedative and hypnotic activity ===
Comparison of selected sedating and hypnotic antihistamines
Antihistamine	Brand name	Dose^{a}	Time to peak	Half-life^{b}	Metabolism	Selective?	Anticholinergic?
Cyproheptadine	Periactin	4–8 mg	1–3 hours	8–9 hours	Unknown	No	Yes
Diphenhydramine	Benadryl	50 mg	2–3 hours	2–9 hours	CYP2D6, others	No	Yes
Doxepin (low-dose)	Silenor	3–6 mg	2–3 hours	17 hours^{c}	CYP2D6, others	Yes (at low doses)	No (at low doses)
Doxylamine	Unisom	25 mg	2–3 hours	10–12 hours	CYP2D6, others	No	Yes
Hydroxyzine	Atarax, Vistaril	25–100 mg	2 hours	20 hours	ADH, CYP3A4, others	Yes (at low doses)	No
Mirtazapine	Remeron	7.5–15 mg	2 hours	20–40 hours	CYP2D6, others	No	No
Quetiapine^{e}	Seroquel	25–200 mg	1.5 hours	7 hours^{d}	CYP3A4	No	No (at low doses)
Footnotes: ^{a} = For sleep/sedation. ^{b} = In adults. ^{c} Active metabolite nordoxepin half-life is 31 hours. ^{d} Active metabolite norquetiapine half-life is 9–12 hours. ^{e} Not recommended per literature reviews. Sources: See individual articles for references. See also selected reviews.

Other non-selective sedating antihistamines used as hypnotics include the antihistamines chlorpheniramine and promethazine, the antidepressants amitriptyline, trimipramine, and trazodone, and the antipsychotics olanzapine, risperidone, and chlorpromazine, among others.

== First-generation (unselective) ==
These are the oldest H_{1}-antihistaminergic drugs and are relatively inexpensive and widely available. They are effective in the relief of allergic symptoms, but are typically moderately to highly potent muscarinic acetylcholine receptor (anticholinergic) antagonists as well. These agents also commonly have action at α-adrenergic receptors and/or 5-HT receptors. This lack of receptor selectivity is the basis of the poor tolerability profile of some of these agents, especially when compared with the second-generation H_{1}-antihistamines. Patient response and occurrence of adverse drug reactions vary greatly between classes and between agents within classes.

=== Classes ===
The first H_{1}-antihistamine discovered was piperoxan, by Ernest Fourneau and Daniel Bovet (1933) in their efforts to develop a guinea pig animal model for anaphylaxis at the Pasteur Institute in Paris. Bovet went on to win the 1957 Nobel Prize in Physiology or Medicine for his contribution. Following their discovery, the first-generation H_{1}-antihistamines were developed in the following decades. They can be classified on the basis of chemical structure, and agents within these groups have similar properties. For details about chemical structure, see § Chemical structure below.

Class	Description	Examples
Ethylenediamines	Ethylenediamines were the first group of clinically effective H_{1}-antihistamines developed.	Mepyramine (pyrilamine); Chloropyramine; Antazoline; Tripelennamine
Ethanolamines	Diphenhydramine was the prototypical agent in this group. Significant anticholinergic adverse effects, as well as sedation, are observed in this group, but the incidence of gastrointestinal adverse effects is relatively low.	Diphenhydramine; Carbinoxamine; Doxylamine; Orphenadrine; Bromazine; Clemastine; Dimenhydrinate
Alkylamines	The isomerism is a significant factor in the activity of the agents in this group. E-triprolidine, for example, is 1000-fold more potent than Z-triprolidine. This difference relates to the positioning and fit of the molecules in the histamine H_{1}-receptor binding site. Alkylamines are considered to have relatively fewer sedative and gastrointestinal adverse effects, but relatively greater incidence of paradoxical central nervous system (CNS) stimulation.	Pheniramine; Chlorphenamine (chlorpheniramine); Dexchlorpheniramine; Dexbrompheniramine; Brompheniramine; Triprolidine; Dimetindene
Piperazines	These compounds are structurally related to the ethylenediamines and the ethanolamines, and produce significant anticholinergic adverse effects with the exception of hydroxyzine, which has low to no affinity for muscarinic acetylcholine receptors and therefore produces negligible anticholinergic side-effects. Compounds from this group are often used for motion sickness, vertigo, nausea, and vomiting. The second-generation H_{1}-antihistamine cetirizine also belongs to this chemical group.	Cyclizine; Chlorcyclizine; Hydroxyzine; Meclizine
Tricyclics and Tetracyclics	These compounds differ from the phenothiazine antipsychotics in the ring-substitution and chain characteristics. They are also structurally related to the tricyclic antidepressants (and tetracyclics), explaining the H_{1}-antihistaminergic adverse effects of those three drug classes and also the poor tolerability profile of tricyclic H_{1}-antihistamines. The second-generation H_{1}-antihistamine loratadine was derived from compounds in this group.	Promethazine; Alimemazine (trimeprazine); Cyproheptadine

== Second-generation ==
Second-generation H_{1}-antihistamines are newer drugs that are much more selective for peripheral H_{1} receptors as opposed to the central nervous system H_{1} receptors and cholinergic receptors. This selectivity significantly reduces the occurrence of adverse drug reactions, such as sedation, while still providing effective relief of allergic conditions. Most of these compounds have peripheral selectivity because they are zwitterionic at physiological pH (around pH 7.4). As such, they are very polar, meaning they are less likely to cross the blood–brain barrier and act mainly outside the central nervous system.

Examples of systemic second-generation antihistamines include:

- Acrivastine (Benadryl Allergy Relief (UK), Semprex-D (US))
- Astemizole (Hismanal) – withdrawn
- Bepotastine (Talion, Bepreve)
- Bilastine (Blexten, Fortecal, Lendin)
- Cetirizine (Zyrtec, Reactine, Benadryl Allergy One a Day Relief (UK))
- Desloratadine (Aerius)
- Ebastine (Evastin, Kestine, Ebastel, Aleva, Ebatrol)
- Fexofenadine (Allegra)
- Ketotifen (Zaditor) – also mast cell stabilizer; sometimes classified as a first-generation antihistamine, see Ketotifen § Classification
- Levocetirizine (Xyzal)
- Loratadine (Claritin)
- Mizolastine (Mizollen)
- Quifenadine (Phencarol, Фенкарол)
- Rupatadine (Rupafin)
- Terfenadine (Seldane (US), Triludan (UK), and Teldane (Australia)) – withdrawn

Examples of topical second-generation antihistamines include:

- Azelastine
- Levocabastine
- Olopatadine

== Chemical structure ==
=== H_{1}-antihistamines ===
H_{1}-antihistamines are mainly used to treat allergy or other types of inflammatory processes related to IgE production. Most drugs from this class act as histamine inverse agonists rather than neutral antagonists, which means they decrease the constitutive activity of the histamine receptor below its basal level.

This activity is closely related to the general chemical structure of H_{1}-antihistamines.:

- One aromatic group (such as a phenyl, substituted phenyl, thienyl, or pyridyl), that mimics hitamine's imidazole group;
- A second aromatic group, which provides extra affinity to the receptor;
- A spacer, which is usually a short chain of two or three carbons;
- An end amine group, typically a tertiary aliphatic amine with simple alkyl substituents, that mimics hitamine's end amine group.

General structure of H_{1}-antihistamines.

From there, you can classify almost any first-generation H_{1}-antihistamine.:

Structural Classification of H_{1}-Antihistamines.
Generation	Chemical Class	X group	Spacer	R_{1}	R_{2}	Examples	
1st-generation antihistamines	Ethylenediamines	N	-(CH_{2})_{n}-	CH_{3}	CH_{3}	Phenbenzamine.	Methapyrilene
1st-generation antihistamines	Ethanolamine ethers	CHO	-(CH_{2})_{n}-	CH_{3}	CH_{3}	Clemastine	Diphenhydramine
1st-generation antihistamines	Alkyl amines	CH or C=C	-(CH_{2})_{n}-	CH_{3}	CH_{3}	Pheniramine	Chlorphenamine
1st-generation antihistamines	Piperazines	CH	Incorporated into a piperazine ring		Alkyl or aralkyl group	Hydroxyzine	Cyclizine
1st-generation antihistamines	Tricyclics	N or C=C	Branched 2–3 carbon chain	CH_{3}	CH_{3}	Cyproheptadine	Promethazine
2nd-generation antihistamines	Various	Various	Various	Various	Various	Fexofenadine, a 2nd generation antihistamine.	

== Regulation ==
=== Over-the-counter ===
H_{1} receptor antagonists that are approved for over-the-counter sale in the United States include the following.

==== First-generation ====
Common/marketed:

- Brompheniramine (Dimetapp, Dimetane)
- Chlorpheniramine (Chlor-Trimeton)
- Dimenhydrinate (Dramamine, Gravol) – combination of diphenhydramine and 8-chlorotheophylline
- Diphenhydramine (Benadryl)
- Doxylamine (Unisom)

Uncommon/discontinued:

- Chlorcyclizine
- Dexbrompheniramine
- Dexchlorpheniramine
- Methapyrilene
- Phenindamine
- Pheniramine
- Phenyltoloxamine
- Pyrilamine
- Thenyldiamine
- Thonzylamine
- Triprolidine

==== Second-generation ====
- Cetirizine (Zyrtec)
- Fexofenadine (Allegra)
- Levocetirizine (Xyzal)
- Loratadine (Alavert, Claritin)

== See also ==
- H_{2}-receptor antagonist
- H_{3}-receptor antagonist
