= Tripelennamine =

Chemical compound

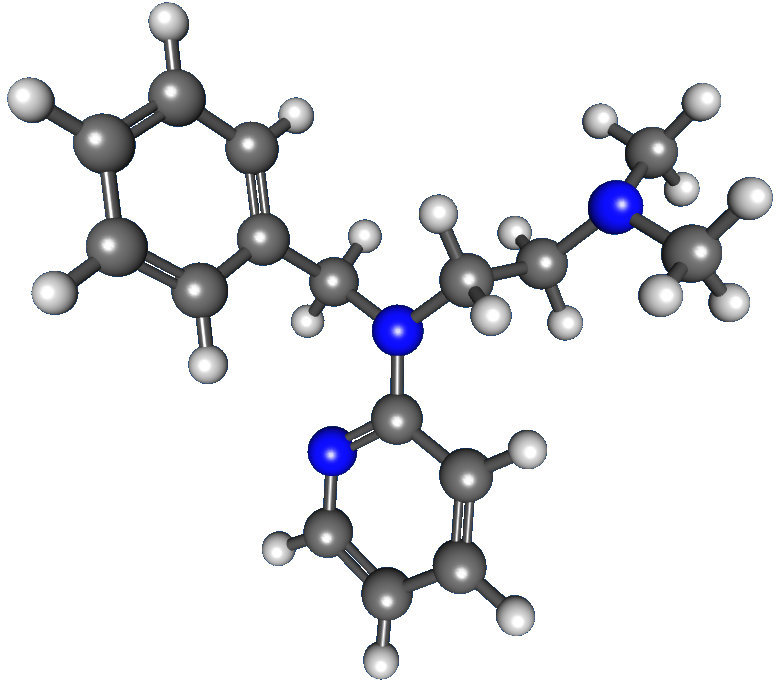

Clinical data
- Trade names: Pyribenzamine
- AHFS/Drugs.com: Multum Consumer Information
- MedlinePlus: a601044
- Routes of administration: Oral, intravenous
- ATC code: D04AA04 (WHO) R06AC04 (WHO)

Legal status
- Legal status: In general: ℞ (Prescription only)

Pharmacokinetic data
- Metabolism: Hepatic hydroxylation and glucuronidation
- Elimination half-life: 4–6 hours
- Excretion: Renal

Identifiers
- IUPAC name: N,N-dimethyl-N'-(phenylmethyl)-N'-pyridin-2-ylethane-1,2-diamine
- CAS Number: 91-81-6 154-69-8 (monohydrochloride) 22306-05-4 (hydrochloride) 57116-36-6 (maleate) 6138-56-3 (citrate)
- PubChem CID: 5587
- IUPHAR/BPS: 7318
- DrugBank: DB00792
- ChemSpider: 5385
- UNII: 3C5ORO99TY
- KEGG: D08645
- ChEMBL: ChEMBL1241
- CompTox Dashboard (EPA): DTXSID8023717
- ECHA InfoCard: 100.001.910

Chemical and physical data
- Formula: C_{16}H_{21}N_{3}
- Molar mass: 255.365 g·mol^{−1}
- 3D model (JSmol): Interactive image
- SMILES: CN(C)CCN(CC1=CC=CC=C1)C2=NC=CC=C2
- InChI: InChI=1S/C16H21N3/c1-18(2)12-13-19(16-10-6-7-11-17-16)14-15-8-4-3-5-9-15/h3-11H,12-14H2,1-2H3; Key:UFLGIAIHIAPJJC-UHFFFAOYSA-N

Tripelennamine, sold under the brand name Pyribenzamine by Novartis, is a drug that is used as an antipruritic and first-generation antihistamine. It can be used in the treatment of asthma, hay fever, rhinitis, and urticaria, but is now less common as it has been replaced by newer antihistamines. The drug was patented at CIBA, which merged with Geigy into Ciba-Geigy, and eventually becoming Novartis.

== Medical uses ==
Where and when it is/was in common use, tripelennamine is used much like other mildly-anticholinergic antihistamines to treat conditions of the upper respiratory tract arising from illnesses and hay fever. It can be used alone or in combination with other agents to have the desired effect. Cough medicines of the general formula tripelennamine + codeine/dihydrocodine/hydrocodone ± expectorant ± decongestant(s) are popular where available. Among these are the Pyribenzamine cough syrups which contain codeine, with and without decongestants, listed in the 1978 Physicians' Desk Reference; the codeine-tripelennamine synergy is well-known and makes such mixtures more useful for their intended purposes.

== Side effects ==
Tripelennamine is mildly sedating. Other side effects can include irritation, dry mouth, nausea, and dizziness.

== Pharmacology ==
=== Pharmacodynamics ===
Tripelennamine acts primarily as an antihistamine, or H_{1} receptor antagonist. It has little to no anticholinergic activity, with 180-fold selectivity for the H_{1} receptor over the muscarinic acetylcholine receptors (for comparison, diphenhydramine had 20-fold selectivity for the H_{1} receptor). In addition to its antihistamine properties, tripelennamine also acts as a weak serotonin-norepinephrine-dopamine reuptake inhibitor (SNDRI).

=== Pharmacokinetics ===
The elimination half-life of tripelennamine is 4 to 6 hours. In a clinical study, the half-life of tripelennamine following intramuscular injection of 50 to 100 mg was 2.9 to 4.4 hours.

== History ==
Tripelennamine was patented in 1946 by Carl Djerassi and colleagues, working at CIBA in New Jersey.

== Society and culture ==
=== Availability ===
Tripelennamine is available in the United States under the brand name PBZ OTC.

== See also ==
- Chloropyramine
- Mepyramine
- Pheniramine
- Pentazocine
