= H3 receptor antagonist =

Antihistaminic drug

An H_{3} receptor antagonist is a type of antihistaminic drug used to block the action of histamine at H_{3} receptors.

Unlike the H_{1} and H_{2} receptors which have primarily peripheral actions, but cause sedation if they are blocked in the brain, H_{3} receptors are primarily found in the brain and are inhibitory autoreceptors located on histaminergic nerve terminals, which modulate the release of histamine. Histamine release in the brain triggers secondary release of excitatory neurotransmitters such as glutamate and acetylcholine via stimulation of H_{1} receptors in the cerebral cortex. Consequently, unlike the H_{1} antagonist antihistamines which are sedating, H_{3} antagonists have stimulant and nootropic effects, and are being researched as potential drugs for the treatment of neurodegenerative conditions such as Alzheimer's disease.

Examples of selective H_{3} antagonists include clobenpropit, ABT-239, ciproxifan, conessine, A-349,821, enerisant, betahistine, and pitolisant.

== History ==
The histamine H_{3} receptor (H_{3}R) was discovered in 1983 and was one of the last receptors that were discovered using conventional pharmacological methods. Its structure was discovered later as a part of an effort to identify a commonly expressed G-protein-coupled receptor (GPCR) in the central nervous system (CNS). The pharmacology of H_{3}R is very complicated which has made drug development difficult. Many different functional isoforms of the H_{3}R exist which means it could theoretically be possible to target a single isoform specifically. That may, however, be difficult due to genetic variability of the isoforms as well as differing functionality of each one.

H_{3}R ligands have now been classified as agonists, antagonists or inverse agonists, depending on the signaling assay used.

== Mechanism of action ==
The H_{3}R is a GPCR and it has been described as a presynaptic autoreceptor, regulating the release of histamine and also as a heteroreceptor, regulating neurotransmitters such as acetylcholine, dopamine, serotonin, norepinephrine and GABA. The receptor has a high constitutive activity which means that it can signal without being activated by an agonist. H_{3}R regulates the release of neurotransmitters by influencing the amount of intracellular calcium. When activated, it blocks the influx of calcium which leads to inhibition of the release of neurotransmitters. Antagonists of the receptors cause synthesis and release of these neurotransmitters which promotes waking. H_{3}Rs are mostly expressed on the histaminergic neurons of the CNS but can also be found in various areas of the peripheral nervous system. The H_{3}R has been found in high densities in the basal ganglia, hippocampus and cortical areas which are all regions of the brain associated with cognition. The histaminergic system has been described as having a role in the pathophysiology of cognitive symptoms of diseases such as Alzheimer's, schizophrenia and narcolepsy.

== Development ==
=== Early pharmacophore ===
In the beginning of development for H_{3}R ligands the focus was on the agonist histamine which contains an imidazole ring in its structure. The structural diversity among H_{3}R is limited and all known H_{3}R agonists today contain an imidazole ring. The problem with the imidazole containing compounds was the inhibition of cytochrome P450 isoenzymes which resulted in severe drug interactions. They also had difficulty in crossing the blood-brain-barrier. Many compounds were tested but they were too toxic to be useful.

Off target function on H_{4}R and other receptors was also a problem with imidazole-based antagonists. The wide variety of potential pathophysiology of H_{3}R in brain disorders makes H_{3}R antagonists interesting for drug development.

==== Thioperamide ====
The first imidazole-based antagonist that was developed was thioperamide which was very potent and selective but was not usable as a drug due to hepatotoxicity. It was originally designed to improve wakefulness and cognition deficit. A recent study showed potential thioperamide treatment of the circadian rhythm of patients with parkinson's disease.

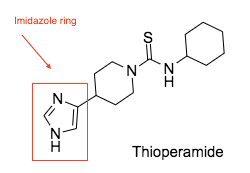
Chemical structure of thioperamide. Early pharmacophore contained an imidazole ring.

=== New pharmacophore ===
The focus turned to non-imidazole H_{3}R antagonists. They do not seem to interact with the CYP family on the same level as imidazole-based H_{3}R antagonists and can reach the CNS more easily. Unfortunately other problems have come up such as strong binding to hERG K^{+} channel, phospholipidosis as well as problems with P-gp substrate. Strong binding to hERG K^{+} channel can lead to QT prolongation.

==== Pitolisant ====
Pitolisant was the first antagonist/inverse agonist to proceed to clinical trials and is the only drug that has been approved by regulatory authorities in the US and Europe. It is highly selective for the H_{3} receptor. Pitolisant has high oral bioavailability and easily accesses the brain. It undergoes extensive first-pass effects through the CYP4A4 enzyme in the gut. The whole metabolic pathway has not yet been established but involves a few CYP enzymes. It has been proved to be useful for maintaining waking-state in the daytime for people with narcolepsy. Side effects encountered in clinical trials were found to be dose-dependent. As expected, some of the adverse effects were neuropsychiatric in character most common of which were insomnia, headache and anxiety. Pitolisant can also potentially cause a prolonged QT interval so caution is advised in cardiac patients. Keeping doses as low as possible can minimize risk for adverse events.

It can be found under the tradename Wakix and is considered an orphan drug. It was approved by the European Commission on 31 March 2016. It is available in 4.5 mg and 18 mg tablets.

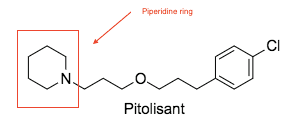
Chemical structure of Pitolisant. New pharmacophore contain non-imidazole compounds, in the case of Pitolisant, a piperidine ring.

=== Structure activity relationship ===
A general structural pattern that is necessary for the antagonist affinity for H_{3}R has been described. An H_{3}R antagonist needs to have a basic amine group which is linked to an aromatic/lipophilic region that is connected to either a polar group or another basic group or a lipophilic region.

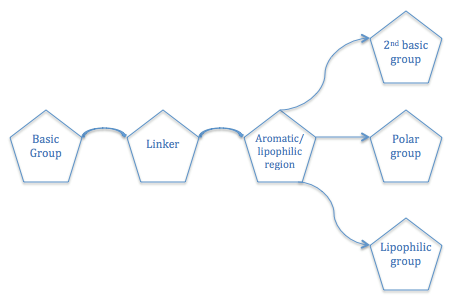
Structure activity relationship for H3R antagonists

== Clinical significance ==
H_{3}R antagonists/inverse agonists demonstrate a possible way to treat diseases of the CNS for example Alzheimer's disease (AD), attention deficit hyperactivity syndrome (ADHD), schizophrenia (SCH), pain, and narcolepsy.

=== Narcolepsy ===
Narcolepsy is a sleeping disorder which is characterised by chronic sleepiness. Cataplexy, hypnagogic hallucinations and sleep paralysis can also be present in narcolepsy. H_{3}R antagonism leads to histamine release into the cerebrospinal fluid which promotes wakefulness. Therefore, H_{3}R antagonists have been studied in the hope of treating narcolepsy. Pitolisant has been approved for treatment of narcolepsy and other H_{3}R antagonists are in clinical trials.

=== Alzheimer's disease (AD) ===
Alzheimer's disease is a progressive neurodegenerative disease of the brain. Though histamine plays a well documented role in AD, the varying levels of histamine in different areas of the brain make it hard to demonstrate a direct link between histaminergic neurotransmission and pathology of AD. In vivo studies have shown that a number of H3R antagonists facilitate learning and memory. Thioperamide blocks H_{3}R and causes an increase in neuronal histamine release which then modifies cognition processes through H_{1}R and H_{2}R and other receptors (e.g. cholinergic and GABA). Degeneration of histaminergic neurons in AD doesn't correlate to H_{3}R expressions since a large portion of H_{3}R in the brain are located elsewhere deep in cortical and thalamocortical neurons among others.

=== Attention deficit hyperactivity disorder (ADHD) ===
ADHD is a neurodevelopmental disorder which is most pronounced in children. Current pharmacological treatments consist of stimulant medications (e.g. methylphenidate), non-stimulant medication (e.g. atomoxetine) and α2 agonists. These medications can cause adverse effects and some types have the potential to cause addiction. Developing alternative treatments is therefore desirable. In vivo studies show potential of using H_{3}R antagonists in ADHD to aid in attention and cognitive activity by elevating release of neurotransmitters such as acetylcholine and dopamine.

=== Schizophrenia ===
In schizophrenia, dopaminergic pathways, among other neurotransmitter systems, play a significant role in the development of the disease. Current treatments are based on first and second generation antipsychotics. These drugs are principally dopamine antagonists, and they can cause many undesirable side-effects. Histaminergic neurons also seem to play a role in schizophrenia, and H_{3} receptors are co-localized with dopamine receptors in GABAergic neurons. H_{3} receptor antagonists may be useful in treating the negative and cognitive symptoms of schizophrenia, even if they are not effective in the treatment of its positive symptoms.

== See also ==
- H_{1}-receptor antagonist
- H_{2}-receptor antagonist
- List of investigational narcolepsy and hypersomnia drugs
