= Dioxopromethazine =

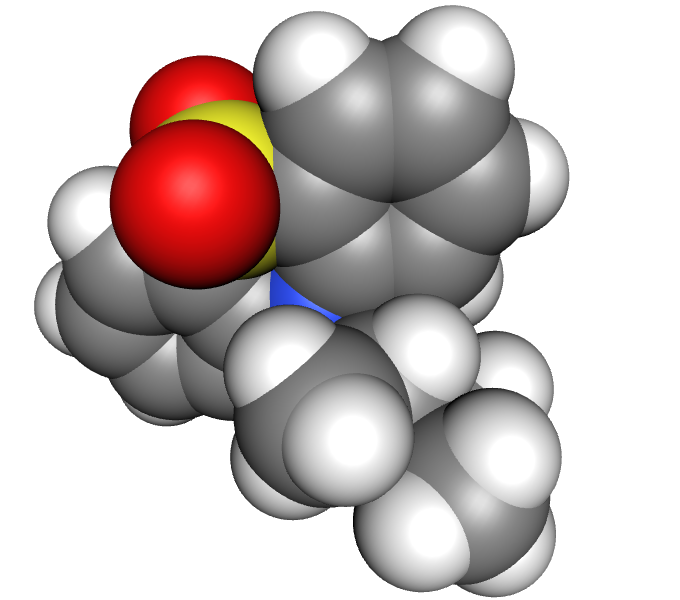

Clinical data
- Trade names: Prothanon
- Other names: 9,9-Dioxopromethazine
- Drug class: antihistamine; antitussive

Legal status
- Legal status: generally not controlled

Identifiers
- IUPAC name: 1-(5,5-dioxophenothiazin-10-yl)-N,N-dimethylpropan-2-amine
- CAS Number: 13582-96-2 13754-56-8; 13582-97-3
- PubChem CID: 63031
- ChemSpider: 56726
- UNII: 6OOT1MR6XS
- ChEMBL: ChEMBL3580712
- CompTox Dashboard (EPA): DTXSID80929821

Chemical and physical data
- Formula: C_{17}H_{20}N_{2}O_{2}S
- Molar mass: 316.42 g·mol^{−1}
- 3D model (JSmol): Interactive image
- SMILES: CC(CN1C2=CC=CC=C2S(=O)(=O)C3=CC=CC=C31)N(C)C
- InChI: InChI=1S/C17H20N2O2S/c1-13(18(2)3)12-19-14-8-4-6-10-16(14)22(20,21)17-11-7-5-9-15(17)19/h4-11,13H,12H2,1-3H3; Key:FDXKCOBAFGSMDJ-UHFFFAOYSA-N

Dioxopromethazine, sold under the trade name Prothanon, is an phenothiazine antihistamine, which is widely used in clinical practice in the form of a racemate for the treatment of respiratory diseases or allergic diseases, commonly used in the form of hydrochloride or hydrogels, especially as eye drops It was first developed and synthesized in the German Democratic Republic in 1967 and later introduced into clinical practice. It was widely used from the 1970s to 1990s, after which there was a proposal to remove Dioxopromethazine from the pharmaceutical market.

== Pharmacology ==
=== Pharmacodynamics ===
Dioxopromethazine – is histamine H1-receptor antagonist that decreases elevated permeability of capillaries and their dilatation induced by histamine released upon allergic reaction. This is a medicament belonging to the group of first-generation antihistamines and phenothiazine derivatives, exhibits antihistamine, as well as antiallergic and anti-inflammatory activity, and was also used as an antitussive agent of equal strength to codeine, or approximately 6–11 times more powerful. Exhibits local anesthetic activity, has a moderate sedative effect, through the mechanism of influence on the central nervous system.

== Side effects ==
Adverse effects after consumption or use include photoallergic contact dermatitis or other severe allergic skin lesions, followed by a persistent photoreaction.
