= Phenbenzamine =

Chemical compound

Clinical data
- Trade names: Antergan
- Other names: RP-2339
- Drug class: Antihistamine; H_{1} receptor antagonist

Identifiers
- IUPAC name: N-(2-Dimethylaminoethyl)-N-benzylaniline
- CAS Number: 961-71-7
- PubChem CID: 13751
- ChemSpider: 13155
- UNII: 733W48NG2Q
- CompTox Dashboard (EPA): DTXSID3043863

Chemical and physical data
- Formula: C_{17}H_{22}N_{2}
- Molar mass: 254.377 g·mol^{−1}
- 3D model (JSmol): Interactive image
- SMILES: CN(C)CCN(Cc1ccccc1)c2ccccc2
- InChI: InChI=1S/C17H22N2/c1-18(2)13-14-19(17-11-7-4-8-12-17)15-16-9-5-3-6-10-16/h3-12H,13-15H2,1-2H3; Key:CHOBRHHOYQKCOU-UHFFFAOYSA-N

Phenbenzamine, sold under the brand name Antergan and known by the former developmental code name RP-2339, is an antihistamine of the ethylenediamine class which also has anticholinergic properties. It was introduced in 1941 or 1942 and was the first antihistamine to be introduced for medical use. Soon following its introduction, phenbenzamine was replaced by another antihistamine of the same class known as mepyramine (pyrilamine; Neoantergan). Following this, other antihistamines, such as diphenhydramine, promethazine, and tripelennamine, were developed and introduced. Owing to their sedative effects, phenbenzamine and promethazine were assessed in the treatment of bipolar disorder in France in the 1940s and were regarded as promising therapies for such purposes. Whereas phenbenzamine was the first clinically useful antihistamine, piperoxan was the first compound with antihistamine properties to be discovered and was synthesized in the early 1930s.

== Chemistry ==
=== Synthesis ===
Phenbenzamine can be prepared by the reaction of N-benzylaniline with 2-chloroethyldimethylamine.

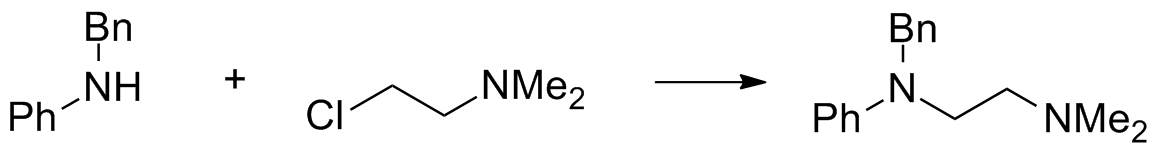
Phenbenzamine synthesis
