= Enerisant =

Clinical data
- Other names: TS-091
- Routes of administration: By mouth

Pharmacokinetic data
- Protein binding: 31.0–31.7%
- Elimination half-life: 8 hours
- Excretion: Kidney (64.5–89.9%)

Identifiers
- IUPAC name: [1-[4-[3-[(2R)-2-methylpyrrolidin-1-yl]propoxy]phenyl]pyrazol-4-yl]-morpholin-4-ylmethanone
- CAS Number: 1152747-82-4
- PubChem CID: 42601503
- IUPHAR/BPS: 11293
- ChemSpider: 44208825
- UNII: E2Y97PQY3A

Chemical and physical data
- Formula: C_{22}H_{30}N_{4}O_{3}
- Molar mass: 398.507 g·mol^{−1}
- 3D model (JSmol): Interactive image
- SMILES: C[C@@H]1CCCN1CCCOC2=CC=C(C=C2)N3C=C(C=N3)C(=O)N4CCOCC4
- InChI: InChI=1S/C22H30N4O3/c1-18-4-2-9-24(18)10-3-13-29-21-7-5-20(6-8-21)26-17-19(16-23-26)22(27)25-11-14-28-15-12-25/h5-8,16-18H,2-4,9-15H2,1H3/t18-/m1/s1; Key:IABXVJILZYNSTM-GOSISDBHSA-N

Enerisant (INN; developmental code name TS-091) is an experimental drug under investigation as a potential treatment for narcolepsy. It is a member of the histamine H_{3} receptor antagonist/inverse agonist class of medications.

== Pharmacology ==
=== Pharmacodynamics ===
Enerisant functions as a potent and highly selective antagonist/inverse agonist of the histamine H_{3} receptor. This mechanism of action is similar to that of pitolisant, a currently approved H_{3} receptor antagonist/inverse agonist for narcolepsy; however, enerisant has demonstrated greater affinity and selectivity for the H_{3} receptor in preclinical studies. By blocking H_{3} receptors, enerisant increases histamine release from histaminergic neurons, leading to stimulation of postsynaptic histamine H_{1} receptors, a key mechanism in promoting wakefulness

=== Pharmacokinetics ===
Enerisant exhibits minimal metabolism in humans and is primarily eliminated unchanged via renal excretion. After oral administration, it rapidly absorbs and exhibits dose-dependent plasma concentrations. Within 48 hours, 64.5-89.9% of the administered dose is recovered unchanged in urine. Plasma protein binding is approximately 31.0–31.7% in humans.

== See also ==
- List of investigational narcolepsy and hypersomnia drugs
