= C17H22N2 =

The molecular formula C_{17}H_{22}N_{2} may refer to:

- Phenbenzamine
- WAY-470
