= Setastine =

Chemical compound

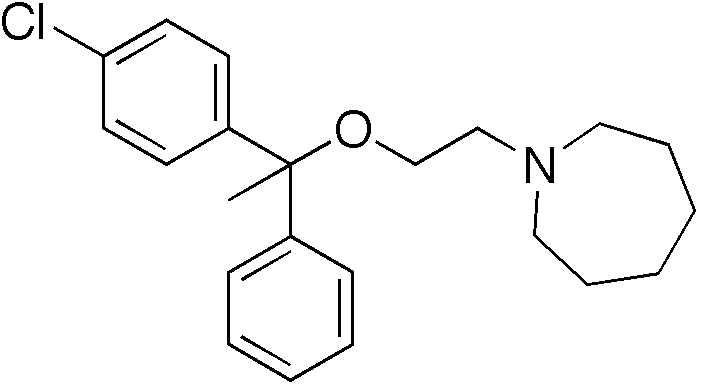

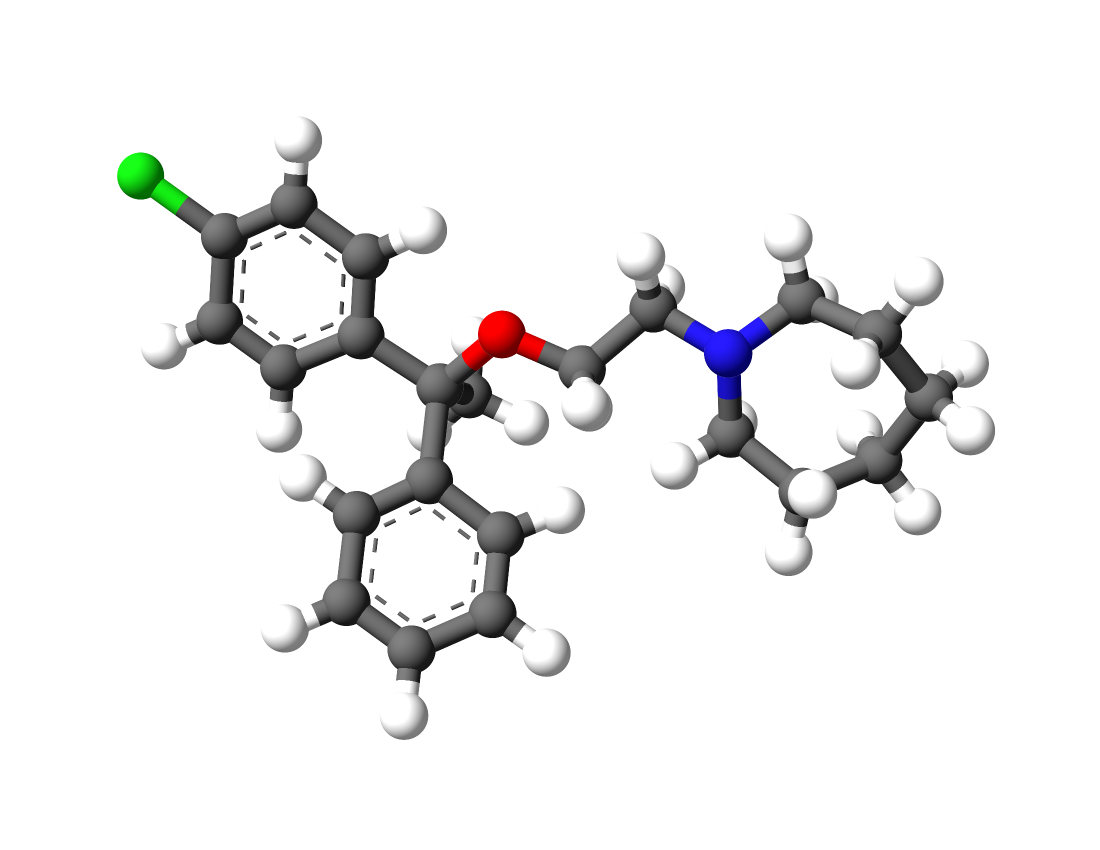

Identifiers
- IUPAC name: 1-[2-[1-(4-chlorophenyl)-1-phenyl-ethoxy]ethyl]azepane
- CAS Number: 64294-95-7; HCl: 59767-13-4
- PubChem CID: 43082
- ChemSpider: 39258
- UNII: 6G3OCF528J; HCl: T2MB6P84ON
- CompTox Dashboard (EPA): DTXSID30867067

Chemical and physical data
- Formula: C_{22}H_{28}ClNO
- Molar mass: 357.92 g·mol^{−1}
- 3D model (JSmol): Interactive image
- SMILES: CC(C1=CC=CC=C1)(C2=CC=C(C=C2)Cl)OCCN3CCCCCC3

Setastine (Loderix) is an antihistamine used to treat allergies and rhinitis.

== Pharmacology ==
=== Pharmacodynamics ===
Setastine acts as a highly selective H_{1} receptor antagonist. It has no anticholinergic, antiadrenergic, or antiserotonergic effects.

=== Pharmacokinetics ===
Setastine penetrates the blood-brain-barrier poorly so it is only mildly sedating compared to related molecules like diphenhydramine.

== See also ==
- Clemastine
