= Mepyramine =

First generation antihistamine

Clinical data
- Other names: Pyrilamine; N-[2-(dimethylamino)ethyl]-N-[(4-methoxyphenyl)methyl]pyridin-2-amine
- AHFS/Drugs.com: International Drug Names
- MedlinePlus: a606008
- Routes of administration: By mouth, topical
- Drug class: First-generation antihistamine
- ATC code: R06AC01 (WHO) D04AA02 (WHO)

Legal status
- Legal status: In general: Over-the-counter (OTC)

Identifiers
- IUPAC name: N-(4-methoxybenzyl)-N',N'-dimethyl-N-pyridin-2-ylethane-1,2-diamine
- CAS Number: 91-84-9 59-33-6 (maleate)
- PubChem CID: 4992
- IUPHAR/BPS: 1227
- DrugBank: DB06691
- ChemSpider: 4818
- UNII: HPE317O9TL
- KEGG: D08183
- ChEBI: CHEBI:6762
- ChEMBL: ChEMBL511
- CompTox Dashboard (EPA): DTXSID9023542
- ECHA InfoCard: 100.001.912

Chemical and physical data
- Formula: C_{17}H_{23}N_{3}O
- Molar mass: 285.391 g·mol^{−1}
- 3D model (JSmol): Interactive image
- SMILES: O(c1ccc(cc1)CN(c2ncccc2)CCN(C)C)C
- InChI: InChI=1S/C17H23N3O/c1-19(2)12-13-20(17-6-4-5-11-18-17)14-15-7-9-16(21-3)10-8-15/h4-11H,12-14H2,1-3H3; Key:YECBIJXISLIIDS-UHFFFAOYSA-N

Mepyramine, also known as pyrilamine, is a first-generation antihistamine, targeting the H_{1} receptor as an inverse agonist. Mepyramine rapidly permeates the brain, often causing drowsiness. It is often sold as a maleate salt, pyrilamine maleate.

The medication has negligible anticholinergic activity, with 130,000-fold selectivity for the histamine H_{1} receptor over the muscarinic acetylcholine receptors (for comparison, diphenhydramine had 20-fold selectivity for the H_{1} receptor). Mepyramine is a potent inhibitor of serotonin reuptake with affinity of 26 nM.

It was patented in 1943 and came into medical use in 1949. It was marketed under the names Histadyl, Histalon, Neo-Antergan, Neo-Pyramine, and Nisaval. In the 1960s and 70s it was a very common component in over-the-counter sleep aids such as Alva-Tranquil, Dormin, Sedacaps, Sominex, Nytol, and many others. The US Food and Drug Administration (FDA) included it in the list of chemicals and compounds barred from use in over-the-counter (OTC) nighttime sleep aid products in 1989.

It is used in over-the-counter combination products to treat the common cold and menstrual symptoms such as Midol Complete. It is also the active ingredient of the topical antihistamine creams Anthisan and Neoantergan sold for the treatment of insect bites, stings, and nettle rash.

== See also ==
- Chloropyramine
