= Bromazine =

Chemical compound

Clinical data
- Trade names: Ambodryl, Ambrodil, Deserol
- Other names: Bromodiphenhydramine; Bromdiphenhydramine
- MedlinePlus: a682065
- Routes of administration: Oral
- ATC code: R06AA01 (WHO)

Pharmacokinetic data
- Bioavailability: High
- Protein binding: 96%
- Metabolism: Mostly hepatic (CYP-mediated), also renal
- Elimination half-life: 1 to 4 hours

Identifiers
- IUPAC name: 2-[(4-Bromophenyl)-phenylmethoxy]-N,N-dimethylethanamine
- CAS Number: 1808-12-4 1808-12-4
- PubChem CID: 2444
- IUPHAR/BPS: 7132
- DrugBank: DB01237
- ChemSpider: 2350
- UNII: 202J683U97
- ChEBI: CHEBI:59177
- ChEMBL: ChEMBL1201245
- CompTox Dashboard (EPA): DTXSID6022688
- ECHA InfoCard: 100.003.854

Chemical and physical data
- Formula: C_{17}H_{20}BrNO
- Molar mass: 334.257 g·mol^{−1}
- 3D model (JSmol): Interactive image
- SMILES: Brc1ccc(cc1)C(OCCN(C)C)c2ccccc2
- InChI: InChI=1S/C17H20BrNO/c1-19(2)12-13-20-17(14-6-4-3-5-7-14)15-8-10-16(18)11-9-15/h3-11,17H,12-13H2,1-2H3; Key:NUNIWXHYABYXKF-UHFFFAOYSA-N

Bromazine, sold under the brand names Ambodryl, Ambrodil, and Deserol among others, also known as bromodiphenhydramine, is an antihistamine and anticholinergic medication of the ethanolamine class. It is an analogue of diphenhydramine with a bromine substitution on one of the phenyl rings.

== Synthesis ==
Synthesis: Patent:

Grignard reaction between phenylmagnesium bromide and para-bromobenzaldehyde [1122-91-4] (1) gives p-bromobenzhydrol [29334-16-5] (2). Halogenation with acetyl bromide in benzene solvent gives p-bromo-benzhydrylbromide [18066-89-2] (3). Finally, etherification with deanol completed the synthesis of Bromazine (4).

== Side effects ==
Continuous and/or cumulative use of anticholinergic medications, including first-generation antihistamines, is associated with higher risk for cognitive decline and dementia in elderly people.
