= ABT-239 =

Chemical compound

Identifiers
- IUPAC name: 4-(2-{2-[(2R)-2-Methylpyrrolidin-1-yl]ethyl}- benzofuran-5-yl)benzonitrile
- CAS Number: 460746-46-7 460746-51-4 (racemic) 460749-29-5 (S-isomer)
- PubChem CID: 9818903
- IUPHAR/BPS: 1218
- ChemSpider: 7994652
- UNII: 86H6B395PI
- ChEMBL: ChEMBL351231
- CompTox Dashboard (EPA): DTXSID00196710

Chemical and physical data
- Formula: C_{22}H_{22}N_{2}O
- Molar mass: 330.431 g·mol^{−1}
- 3D model (JSmol): Interactive image
- SMILES: N#CC1=CC=C(C2=CC3=C(C=C2)OC(CCN4[C@@H](CCC4)C)=C3)C=C1
- InChI: InChI=1S/C22H22N2O/c1-16-3-2-11-24(16)12-10-21-14-20-13-19(8-9-22(20)25-21)18-6-4-17(15-23)5-7-18/h4-9,13-14,16H,2-3,10-12H2,1H3/t16-/m1/s1; Key:KFHYZKCRXNRKRC-MRXNPFEDSA-N

ABT-239 is an H_{3}-receptor inverse agonist developed by Abbott. It has stimulant and nootropic effects, and has been investigated as a treatment for ADHD, Alzheimer's disease, and schizophrenia. ABT-239 is more active at the human H_{3} receptor than comparable agents such as thioperamide, ciproxifan, and cipralisant. It was ultimately dropped from human trials after showing the dangerous cardiac side effect of QT prolongation, but is still widely used in animal research into H_{3} antagonists / inverse agonists.
