= Astemizole =

Antihistamine drug

Clinical data
- AHFS/Drugs.com: Multum Consumer Information
- MedlinePlus: a600034
- Pregnancy category: C (USA)
- Routes of administration: Oral
- ATC code: R06AX11 (WHO)

Legal status
- Legal status: Withdrawn

Pharmacokinetic data
- Protein binding: ~96%
- Metabolism: Hepatic (CYP3A4)
- Elimination half-life: 24 hours
- Excretion: Fecal

Identifiers
- IUPAC name: 1-[(4-fluorophenyl)methyl]-N-[1-[2-(4-methoxyphenyl)ethyl]-4-piperidyl]benzoimidazol-2-amine
- CAS Number: 68844-77-9
- PubChem CID: 2247
- IUPHAR/BPS: 2603
- DrugBank: DB00637
- ChemSpider: 2160
- UNII: 7HU6337315
- KEGG: D00234
- ChEBI: CHEBI:2896
- ChEMBL: ChEMBL296419
- CompTox Dashboard (EPA): DTXSID9020110
- ECHA InfoCard: 100.065.837

Chemical and physical data
- Formula: C_{28}H_{31}FN_{4}O
- Molar mass: 458.581 g·mol^{−1}
- 3D model (JSmol): Interactive image
- SMILES: Fc1ccc(cc1)Cn2c5ccccc5nc2NC4CCN(CCc3ccc(OC)cc3)CC4
- InChI: InChI=1S/C28H31FN4O/c1-34-25-12-8-21(9-13-25)14-17-32-18-15-24(16-19-32)30-28-31-26-4-2-3-5-27(26)33(28)20-22-6-10-23(29)11-7-22/h2-13,24H,14-20H2,1H3,(H,30,31); Key:GXDALQBWZGODGZ-UHFFFAOYSA-N

Astemizole (marketed under the brand name Hismanal, developmental code R43512) was a second-generation antihistamine drug that has a long duration of action. Astemizole was discovered by Janssen Pharmaceutica in 1977. It was withdrawn from the market globally in 1999 because of rare but potentially fatal side effects (QTc interval prolongation and related arrhythmias due to hERG channel blockade).

== Pharmacology ==
Astemizole is a histamine H1-receptor antagonist. It has anticholinergic and antipruritic effects.

Astemizole is rapidly absorbed from the gastrointestinal tract and competitively binds to histamine H_{1} receptor sites in the gastrointestinal tract, uterus, blood vessels, and bronchial muscle. This suppresses the formation of edema and pruritus (caused by histamine).

Despite some earlier reports that astemizole does not cross the blood–brain barrier, several studies have shown high permeability and high binding to protein folds associated with Alzheimer's.

Astemizole may also act on histamine H_{3} receptors, thereby producing adverse effects.

Astemizole does also act as FIASMA (functional inhibitor of acid sphingomyelinase).

Astemizole has been researched as a treatment for Creutzfeldt-Jakob Disease (CJD).

Like many carbendazim-derived benzimidazoles, it has been reported to interact with tubulin and inhibit its polymerization.

== Toxicity ==
Astemizole has an oral LD_{50} of approximately 2052 mg/kg (in mice).
