= Piperoxan =

Chemical compound

Clinical data
- Other names: Benodaine
- Routes of administration: Oral
- ATC code: None

Identifiers
- IUPAC name: 1-(2,3-dihydro-1,4-benzodioxin-2-ylmethyl)piperidine
- CAS Number: 59-39-2 135-87-5 (hydrochloride)
- PubChem CID: 6040
- ChemSpider: 5817
- UNII: 9ZCS27634Y
- ChEMBL: ChEMBL31836
- CompTox Dashboard (EPA): DTXSID1046269

Chemical and physical data
- Formula: C_{14}H_{19}NO_{2}
- Molar mass: 233.311 g·mol^{−1}
- 3D model (JSmol): Interactive image
- SMILES: O1c3c(OC(C1)CN2CCCCC2)cccc3

Piperoxan, also known as benodaine, was the first antihistamine to be discovered. This compound, derived from benzodioxan, was prepared in the early 1930s by Daniel Bovet and Ernest Fourneau at the Pasteur Institute in France. Formerly investigated by Fourneau as an α-adrenergic-blocking agent, they demonstrated that it also antagonized histamine-induced bronchospasm in guinea pigs, and published their findings in 1933. Bovet went on to win the 1957 Nobel Prize in Physiology or Medicine for his contribution. One of Bovet and Fourneau's students, Anne-Marie Staub, published the first structure–activity relationship (SAR) study of antihistamines in 1939. Piperoxan and analogues themselves were not clinically useful due to the production of toxic effects in humans and were followed by phenbenzamine (Antergan) in the early 1940s, which was the first antihistamine to be marketed for medical use.

== Synthesis ==
Synthesis: Patent:

Condensation of catechol [120-80-9] (1) with epichlorohydrin in the presence of an aqueous base can be visualized as proceeding initially with the epoxide (2) Opening of the oxirane ring by the phenoxide anion then leads to 2-hydroxymethyl-1,4-benzodioxane [3663-82-9] (3). Halogenation with thionyl chloride gives 2-chloromethyl-1,4-benzodioxane [2164-33-2] (4). Displacement of the leaving group by piperidine completed the synthesis of piperoxan (5).
