= A-349821 =

Chemical compound

Identifiers
- IUPAC name: [4-[4-[3-[(2R,5R)-2,5-dimethylpyrrolidin-1-yl]propoxy]phenyl]phenyl]-morpholin-4-ylmethanone
- CAS Number: 372513-99-0 556835-30-4 (trifluoroacetate salt)
- PubChem CID: 9954017
- IUPHAR/BPS: 1217
- ChemSpider: 8129627
- UNII: 67WL275ISI
- ChEMBL: ChEMBL179702
- CompTox Dashboard (EPA): DTXSID701116601

Chemical and physical data
- Formula: C_{26}H_{34}N_{2}O_{3}
- Molar mass: 422.569 g·mol^{−1}
- 3D model (JSmol): Interactive image
- SMILES: C[C@@H]1CC[C@H](N1CCCOC2=CC=C(C=C2)C3=CC=C(C=C3)C(=O)N4CCOCC4)C
- InChI: InChI=1S/C26H34N2O3/c1-20-4-5-21(2)28(20)14-3-17-31-25-12-10-23(11-13-25)22-6-8-24(9-7-22)26(29)27-15-18-30-19-16-27/h6-13,20-21H,3-5,14-19H2,1-2H3/t20-,21-/m1/s1; Key:CFUHKRLMDNFZED-NHCUHLMSSA-N

A-349,821 is a potent and selective histamine H_{3} receptor antagonist (or possibly an inverse agonist). It has nootropic effects in animal studies, although there do not appear to be any plans for clinical development at present and it is currently only used in laboratory research.

== See also ==
- H_{3} receptor antagonist
