= Triprolidine =

Antihistamine medication

Clinical data
- Trade names: Flonase Nighttime Allergy Relief, Actidil, others
- AHFS/Drugs.com: Monograph
- Pregnancy category: C (US)
- Routes of administration: By mouth
- ATC code: R06AX07 (WHO)

Legal status
- Legal status: US: OTC

Pharmacokinetic data
- Bioavailability: Oral: 4%
- Protein binding: 90%
- Metabolism: Hepatic (CYP2D6)
- Elimination half-life: 4–6 hours
- Excretion: Renal

Identifiers
- IUPAC name: 2-[(E)-1-(4-methylphenyl)-3-pyrrolidin-1-yl- prop-1-enyl]pyridine
- CAS Number: 486-12-4
- PubChem CID: 5282443
- IUPHAR/BPS: 1228
- DrugBank: DB00427
- ChemSpider: 4445597
- UNII: 2L8T9S52QM
- KEGG: D01782
- ChEBI: CHEBI:84116
- ChEMBL: ChEMBL855
- CompTox Dashboard (EPA): DTXSID3023718
- ECHA InfoCard: 100.006.934

Chemical and physical data
- Formula: C_{19}H_{22}N_{2}
- Molar mass: 278.399 g·mol^{−1}
- 3D model (JSmol): Interactive image
- Melting point: 60 °C (140 °F)
- Solubility in water: 500 mg/mL (20 °C)
- SMILES: n3c(\C(=C\CN1CCCC1)c2ccc(cc2)C)cccc3
- InChI: InChI=1S/C19H22N2/c1-16-7-9-17(10-8-16)18(19-6-2-3-12-20-19)11-15-21-13-4-5-14-21/h2-3,6-12H,4-5,13-15H2,1H3/b18-11+; Key:CBEQULMOCCWAQT-WOJGMQOQSA-N

Triprolidine is an over-the-counter first-generation antihistamine with strong anticholinergic properties. It is used to combat the symptoms associated with allergies and is sometimes combined with other medications in preparations designed to provide general relief for flu-like symptoms. As with many antihistamines, the most common side effect is drowsiness.

Triprolidine was patented in 1948 and came into medical use in 1953, and has mostly been replaced in popular cold and flu medications by other drugs such as diphenhydramine, promethazine, chlorpheniramine, loratadine and fexofenadine.

== See also ==
- Benzatropine
- Pseudoephedrine
