= VUF-6002 =

Chemical compound

Identifiers
- IUPAC name: (6-chloro-1H-benzimidazol-2-yl)-(4-methylpiperazin-1-yl)methanone
- CAS Number: 73903-17-0; maleate: 869497-75-6
- PubChem CID: 10446295
- IUPHAR/BPS: 1277
- ChemSpider: 8621714
- UNII: 7EE5T3WL8P
- CompTox Dashboard (EPA): DTXSID801170826

Chemical and physical data
- Formula: C_{13}H_{15}ClN_{4}O
- Molar mass: 278.74 g·mol^{−1}
- 3D model (JSmol): Interactive image
- SMILES: CN3CCN(C(=O)c2nc1cc(Cl)ccc1[nH]2)CC3
- InChI: InChI=1S/C13H15ClN4O/c1-17-4-6-18(7-5-17)13(19)12-15-10-3-2-9(14)8-11(10)16-12/h2-3,8H,4-7H2,1H3,(H,15,16); Key:MOIWSUQWIOVGRH-UHFFFAOYSA-N

VUF-6002 (JNJ-10191584) is a drug which acts as a potent and selective antagonist at the histamine H4 receptor. It has anti-inflammatory and analgesic effects in animal studies of inflammatory diseases.

== See also ==
- JNJ-7777120 (same molecule but where one nitrogen has been exchanged for a carbon)
