= Promethazine =

Sedating antihistamine

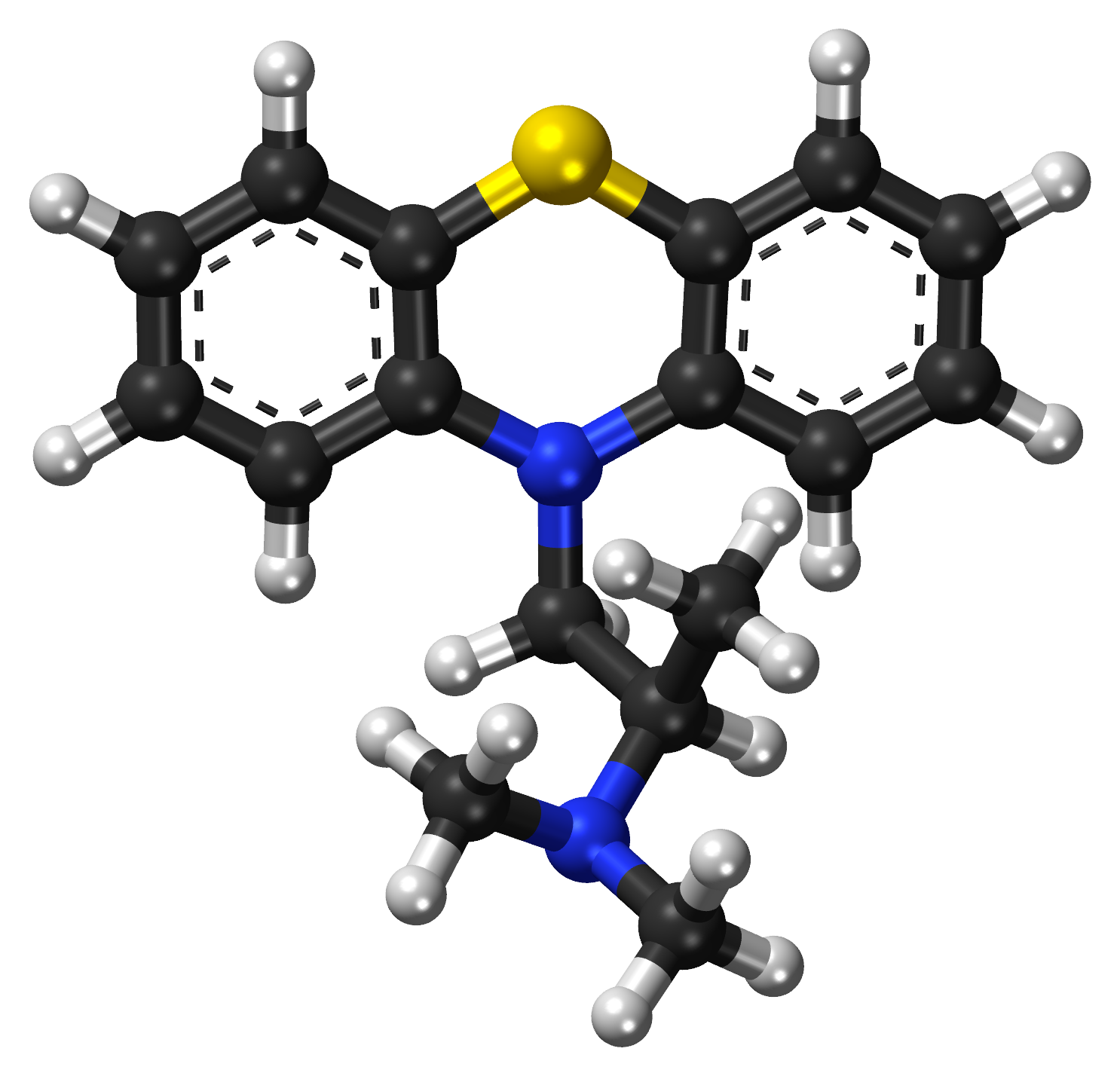

Clinical data
- Trade names: Phenergan, others
- AHFS/Drugs.com: Monograph
- MedlinePlus: a682284
- License data: US DailyMed: Promethazine
- Pregnancy category: AU: C
- Dependence liability: Low
- Addiction liability: None-Very low
- Routes of administration: By mouth, rectal, intravenous, intramuscular, topical
- Drug class: First-generation antihistamine; Sedative-hypnotic; Antiemetic
- ATC code: D04AA10 (WHO) R06AD02 (WHO)

Legal status
- Legal status: AU: S3 (Pharmacist only); CA: OTC; NZ: OTC -Pharmacist only; UK: P (Pharmacy medicines) (POM when injection); US: ℞-only; South Africa: S5 IV, S2 oral; Sweden: Rx-only

Pharmacokinetic data
- Bioavailability: 88% absorbed but after first-pass metabolism reduced to 25% absolute bioavailability
- Protein binding: 93%
- Metabolism: Liver glucuronidation and sulfoxidation
- Metabolites: Promethazine Sulphoxide, Desmethylpromethazine, Promethazine Hydroxy
- Elimination half-life: 10–19 hours
- Duration of action: 4–6 hours (sometimes up to 12 hours)
- Excretion: Kidney and Bile duct

Identifiers
- IUPAC name: (RS)-N,N-Dimethyl-1-(10H-phenothiazin-10-yl)propan-2-amine
- CAS Number: 60-87-7 58-33-3 (HCl)
- PubChem CID: 4927
- IUPHAR/BPS: 7282
- DrugBank: DB01069
- ChemSpider: 4758
- UNII: FF28EJQ494
- KEGG: D00494
- ChEBI: CHEBI:8461
- ChEMBL: ChEMBL643
- CompTox Dashboard (EPA): DTXSID7023518
- ECHA InfoCard: 100.000.445

Chemical and physical data
- Formula: C_{17}H_{20}N_{2}S
- Molar mass: 284.42 g·mol^{−1}
- 3D model (JSmol): Interactive image
- Chirality: Racemic mixture
- SMILES: S2c1ccccc1N(c3c2cccc3)CC(N(C)C)C
- InChI: InChI=1S/C17H20N2S/c1-13(18(2)3)12-19-14-8-4-6-10-16(14)20-17-11-7-5-9-15(17)19/h4-11,13H,12H2,1-3H3; Key:PWWVAXIEGOYWEE-UHFFFAOYSA-N

Promethazine, sold under the brand name Phenergan among others, is a first-generation antihistamine, sedative, and antiemetic used to treat allergies, nausea, and vomiting. It may also help with some symptoms associated with the common cold and may also be used for sedating people who are agitated or anxious, an effect that has led to some recreational use (especially with codeine). Promethazine is taken by mouth (oral), as a rectal suppository, or by injection into a muscle (IM).

Common side effects of promethazine include confusion and sleepiness; consumption of alcohol or other sedatives can make these symptoms worse. It is unclear if use of promethazine during pregnancy or breastfeeding is safe. Use of promethazine is not recommended in those less than two years old, due to potentially negative effects on breathing. Use of promethazine by injection into a vein is not recommended, due to potential skin damage. Promethazine is in the phenothiazine family of medications. It is also a strong anticholinergic and at high or toxic doses can act as a deliriant.

Promethazine was made in the 1940s by a team of scientists from Rhône-Poulenc laboratories. It was approved for medical use in the United States in 1951. It is a generic medication and is available under many brand names globally. In 2023, it was the 230th most commonly prescribed medication in the United States, with more than 1 million prescriptions; and the combination with dextromethorphan was the 252nd most commonly prescribed medication in the United States, with more than 1 million prescriptions.

== Medical uses ==
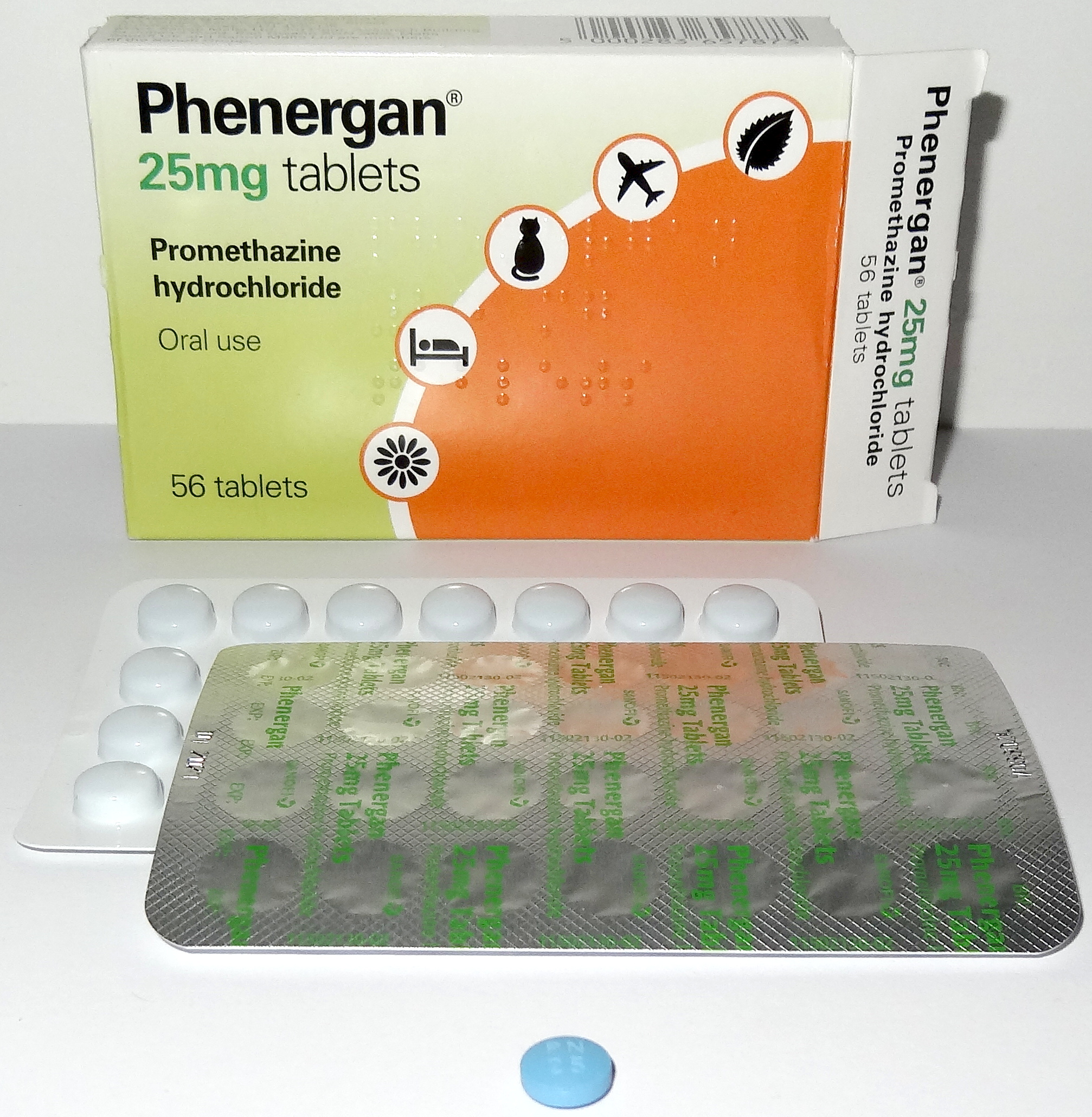
Phenergan (promethazine) blister pack 25mg tablets

Promethazine has a variety of medical uses, including:

- Sedation
- In Germany, it is approved for the treatment of agitation and agitation associated with underlying psychiatric disorders with a maximum daily dose of 200mg.
- For nausea and vomiting associated with anesthesia or chemotherapy. It is commonly used postoperatively as an antiemetic. The antiemetic activity increases with increased dosing; however, side effects also increase, which often limits maximal dosing.
- For moderate to severe morning sickness and hyperemesis gravidarum: In the UK, promethazine is the drug of first choice. Promethazine is preferred during pregnancy because it is an older drug and there is more data regarding the use of it during pregnancy. Second-choice medications, which are used if promethazine is not tolerated or the patient cannot take it, are metoclopramide or prochlorperazine.
- For allergies such as hay fever and together with other medications in anaphylaxis
- To aid with symptoms of the common cold
- Motion sickness, including space sickness
- Hemolytic disease of the newborn
- Anxiety before surgery
- May be used to treat cannabinoid hyperemesis syndrome

== Side effects ==
Some documented side effects include:

- Tardive dyskinesia, pseudoparkinsonism, acute dystonia (effects due to dopamine D2 receptor antagonism)
- Confusion in the elderly
- Drowsiness, dizziness, fatigue, more rarely vertigo
- Known to have effects on serotonin and dopamine receptors.
- Dry mouth
- Nausea
- Respiratory depression in patients under the age of two and those with severely compromised pulmonary function
- Blurred vision, xerostomia, dry nasal passages, dilated pupils, constipation, and urinary retention. (due to its anticholinergic effects)
- Chest discomfort/pressure (In children less than 2 years old)
- Akathisia

Less frequent:

- Cardiovascular side effects to include arrhythmias and hypotension
- Neuroleptic malignant syndrome
- Liver damage and cholestatic jaundice
- Bone marrow suppression, potentially resulting in agranulocytosis, thrombocytopenia, and leukopenia
- Depression of the thermoregulatory mechanism resulting in hypothermia/hyperthermia

Rare side effects include:

- Seizures

Because of the potential for more severe side effects, this drug is on the list to avoid in the elderly. In many countries (including the US and UK), promethazine is contraindicated in children less than two years of age, and strongly cautioned against in children between two and six, due to problems with respiratory depression and sleep apnea.

Promethazine is listed as one of the drugs with the highest anticholinergic activity in a study of anticholinergic burden, including long-term cognitive impairment.

=== Tissue necrosis risks specific to the injectable form ===
Injectable promethazine is a vesicant and is capable of damaging blood vessel intima, potentially resulting in tissue injury and gangrene. A large number of severe complications have been reported following inadvertent arterial injection, subcutaneous injection, or extravasation of promethazine, including the amputation of fingers and a forearm. One lawsuit reached the Supreme Court of the United States and resulted in $6.7 million in damages. Severe injuries resulting from inadvertent arterial injections of promethazine have been known since at least the 1970s. When injectable promethazine must be used, the Institute for Safe Medication Practices recommends limiting the dose to between 6.25 mg or 12.5 mg, using central access sites and large veins, administering the drug slowly, or resorting to safer options.

== Overdose ==
Promethazine in overdose can produce signs and symptoms including CNS depression, hypotension, respiratory depression, unconsciousness, and sudden death. Other reactions may include hyperreflexia, hypertonia, ataxia, athetosis, and extensor-plantar reflexes. Atypically and/or rarely, stimulation, convulsions, hyperexcitability, and nightmares may occur. Anticholinergic effects, like dry mouth, dilated pupils, flushing, gastrointestinal symptoms, and delirium, may occur as well. Treatment of overdose is supportive and based on symptoms.

== Pharmacology ==
Promethazine, a phenothiazine derivative, is structurally different from the neuroleptic phenothiazines, with similar but different effects. Despite structural differences, promethazine exhibits a strikingly similar binding profile to promazine, another phenothiazine compound. Both promethazine and promazine exhibit comparable neuroleptic potency, with a neuroleptic potency of 0.5. However, dosages used therapeutically, such as for sedation, have no antipsychotic effect. It acts primarily as a strong antagonist of the H_{1} receptor (antihistamine, K_{i} = 1.4 nM) and a moderate mACh receptor antagonist (anticholinergic), and also has weak to moderate affinity for the 5-HT_{2A}, 5-HT_{2C}, D_{2}, and α_{1}-adrenergic receptors, where it acts as an antagonist at all sites, as well. New studies have shown that promethazine acts as a strong non-competitive selective NMDA receptor antagonist, with an EC50 of 20 μM; which might promote sedation in addition with the strong antihistaminergic effects of the H_{1} receptor, but also as a weaker analgesic. It does not, however, affect the AMPA receptors.

Another notable use of promethazine is as a local anesthetic, by blockage of sodium channels.

Binding to receptors in nM (K_{i})
receptor	K_{i} (nM)	ref
α1A-adrenoceptor (Rat)	32	
α1B-adrenoceptor (Rat)	21	
α1D-adrenoceptor (Human)	90	
α2A-adrenoceptor (Human)	256	
α2B-adrenoceptor (Human)	24	
α2C-adrenoceptor (Human)	353	
Calmodulin (Human)	60000	
Calmodulin (Bovine)	50000	
Chloroquine resistance transporter (Plasmodium falciparum)	85000	
D1 receptor (Human)	1372	
D2 receptor (Human)	260	
D3 receptor (Human)	190	
H1 receptor (Human)	0.33-1.4	
H2 receptor (Human)	1146	
M1 receptor (Human)	3.32	
M2 receptor (Human)	12	
M3 receptor (Human)	4.15	
M4 receptor (Human)	1.06	
M5 receptor (Human)	3.31	
NET (Norephinephrine transporter) (Human)	4203	
Prion protein (Human)	8000	
5-HT1A receptor (Rat)	1484	
5-HT2A receptor (Human)	19	
5-HT2B receptor (Human)	43	
5-HT2C receptor (Human)	6.48	
5-HT6 receptor (Human)	1128	
SERT (Serotonin transporter) (Human)	2130	
Sigma1 receptor (Human)	120	
OCT1 (Human)	35100	

== Chemistry ==
Solid promethazine hydrochloride is a white to faint-yellow, practically odorless, crystalline powder. Slow oxidation may occur upon prolonged exposure to air, usually causing blue discoloration. Its hydrochloride salt is freely soluble in water and somewhat soluble in alcohol. Promethazine is a chiral compound, occurring as a mixture of enantiomers.

== History ==
Promethazine was first synthesized by a group at Rhone-Poulenc (which later became part of Sanofi) led by Paul Charpentier in the 1940s. The team was seeking to improve on diphenhydramine; the same line of medical chemistry led to the creation of chlorpromazine.

== Society and culture ==
As of July 2017, it is marketed under many brand names worldwide: Allersoothe, Antiallersin, Anvomin, Atosil, Avomine, Closin N, Codopalm, Diphergan, Farganesse, Fenazil, Fenergan, Fenezal, Frinova, Hiberna, Histabil, Histaloc, Histantil, Histazin, Histazine, Histerzin, Lenazine, Lergigan, Nufapreg, Otosil, Pamergan, Pharmaniaga, Phenadoz, Phenerex, Phenergan, Phénergan, Pipolphen, Polfergan, Proazamine, Progene, Prohist, Promet, Prometal, Prometazin, Prometazina, Promethazin, Prométhazine, Promethazinum, Promethegan, Promezin, Proneurin, Prothazin, Prothiazine, Prozin, Pyrethia, Quitazine, Reactifargan, Receptozine, Romergan, Sominex, Sylomet, Vertigon, Xepagan, Zinmet, and Zoralix.

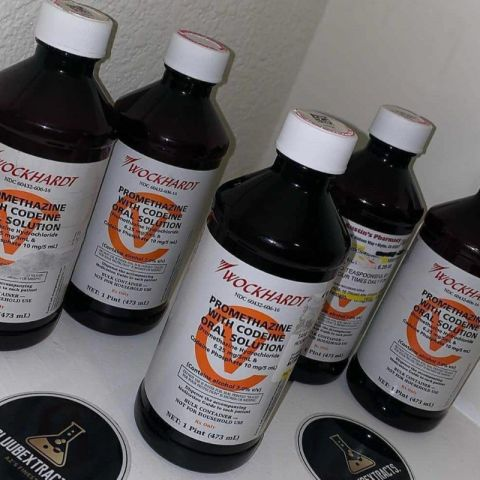
Promethazine with Codeine syrup

It is also marketed in many combination drug formulations:

- with carbocisteine as Actithiol Antihistaminico, Mucoease, Mucoprom, Mucotal Prometazine, and Rhinathiol;
- with paracetamol (acetaminophen) as Algotropyl, Calmkid, Fevril, Phen Plus, and Velpro-P;
- with paracetamol and dextromethorphan as Choligrip na noc, Coldrex Nočná Liečba, Fedril Night Cold and Flu, Night Nurse, and Tachinotte;
- with paracetamol, phenylephrine, and salicylamide as Flukit;
- with dextromethorphan as Axcel Dextrozine and Hosedyl DM;
- with dextromethorphan and ephedrine as Methorsedyl;
- with dextromethorphan and pseudoephedrine as Sedilix-DM;
- with dextromethorphan and phenylephedrine as Sedilix-RX;
- with pholcodine as Codo-Q Junior and Tixylix;
- with pholcodine and ephedrine as Phensedyl Dry Cough Linctus;
- with pholcodine and phenylephedrine as Russedyl Compound Linctus;
- with pholcodine and phenylpropanolamine as Triple 'P';
- with codeine as Kefei and Procodin;
- with codeine and ephedrine as Dhasedyl, Fendyl, and P.E.C.;
- with ephedrine and dextromethorphan as Dhasedyl DM;
- with glutamic acid as Psico-Soma, and Psicosoma;
- with noscapine as Tussisedal; and
- with chlorpromazine and phenobarbital as Vegetamin.

=== Recreational use ===
The recreational drug lean, also known as "purple drank" among other names, consists of promethazine mixed with Sprite and either an opiate or opioid.

=== Product liability lawsuit ===
In 2009, the US Supreme Court ruled on a product liability case involving promethazine. Diana Levine, a woman with a migraine, was administered Wyeth's Phenergan via IV push. The drug was injected improperly, resulting in gangrene and subsequent amputation of her right forearm below the elbow. A state jury awarded her $6 million in punitive damages.

The case was appealed to the Supreme Court on grounds of federal preemption and substantive due process. The Supreme Court upheld the lower courts' rulings, stating that "Wyeth could have unilaterally added a stronger warning about IV-push administration" without acting in opposition to federal law. In effect, this means drug manufacturers can be held liable for injuries if warnings of potential adverse effects, approved by the US Food and Drug Administration (FDA), are deemed insufficient by state courts.

In September 2009, the FDA required a boxed warning be put on promethazine for injection, stating the contraindication for subcutaneous administration. The preferred administrative route is intramuscular, which reduces the risk of surrounding muscle and tissue damage.
