= Conessine =

Names
- Preferred IUPAC name (3S,3aS,5aS,5bR,9S,11aR,11bS,13aR)-N,N,2,3,11a-Pentamethyl-2,3,3a,4,5,5a,5b,6,8,9,10,11,11a,11b,12,13-hexadecahydro-1H-naphtho[2′,1′:4,5]indeno[1,7a-c]pyrrol-9-amine
- Other names Neriine; Roquessine; Wrightine; Conessinum; (3β)-N,N-Dimethyl-con-5-enin-3-amine

Identifiers
CAS Number	546-06-5
3D model (JSmol)	Interactive image
ChEBI	CHEBI:27965
ChEMBL	ChEMBL191703
ChemSpider	389885
ECHA InfoCard	100.008.089
MeSH	Conessine
PubChem CID	441082
UNII	EZ38J9BBDF
CompTox Dashboard (EPA)	DTXSID6046000
- InChI: InChI=1S/C24H40N2/c1-16-20-8-9-22-19-7-6-17-14-18(25(3)4)10-12-23(17,2)21(19)11-13-24(20,22)15-26(16)5/h6,16,18-22H,7-15H2,1-5H3/t16-,18-,19+,20+,21-,22-,23-,24-/m0/s1 Key: GPLGAQQQNWMVMM-MYAJQUOBSA-N; InChI=1/C24H40N2/c1-16-20-8-9-22-19-7-6-17-14-18(25(3)4)10-12-23(17,2)21(19)11-13-24(20,22)15-26(16)5/h6,16,18-22H,7-15H2,1-5H3/t16-,18-,19+,20+,21-,22-,23-,24-/m0/s1 Key: GPLGAQQQNWMVMM-MYAJQUOBBK
- SMILES: C[C@H]1[C@H]2CC[C@@H]3[C@@]2(CC[C@H]4[C@H]3CC=C5[C@@]4(CC[C@@H](C5)N(C)C)C)CN1C

Properties
Chemical formula	C_{24}H_{40}N_{2}
Molar mass	356.598 g·mol^{−1}
- Except where otherwise noted, data are given for materials in their standard state (at 25 °C [77 °F], 100 kPa). verify (what is ?) Infobox references

Conessine is a steroidal alkaloid found in a number of plant species from the family Apocynaceae, including Holarrhena floribunda, Holarrhena antidysenterica and Funtumia elastica. It acts as a histamine antagonist, selective for the H_{3} subtype (with an affinity of pK_{i} = 8.27; K_{i} = ~5 nM). It was also found to have long CNS clearance times, high blood–brain barrier penetration and high affinity for the adrenergic receptors.
