= JNJ-7777120 =

Chemical compound

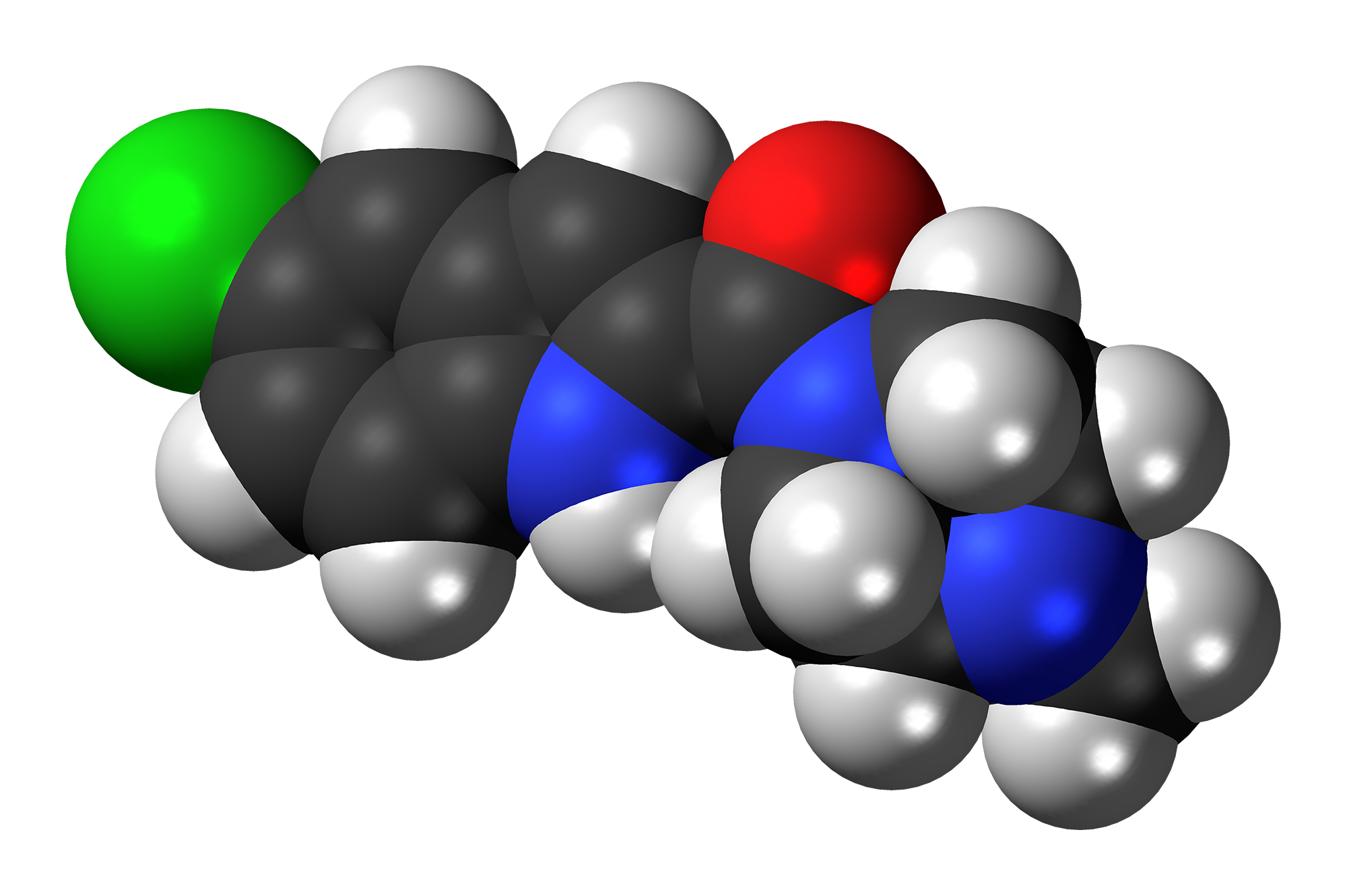

Clinical data
- Other names: 1-[(5-chloro-1H-indol-2-yl)carbonyl]-4-methylpiperazine

Identifiers
- IUPAC name: 5-chloro-2-[(4-methylpiperazin-1-yl)carbonyl]-1H-indole
- CAS Number: 459168-41-3
- PubChem CID: 4908365
- IUPHAR/BPS: 1278
- ChemSpider: 4090750
- UNII: 4H1AU2V37X
- ChEMBL: ChEMBL129198
- CompTox Dashboard (EPA): DTXSID20963461
- ECHA InfoCard: 100.164.683

Chemical and physical data
- Formula: C_{14}H_{16}ClN_{3}O
- Molar mass: 277.75 g·mol^{−1}
- 3D model (JSmol): Interactive image
- SMILES: C3CN(C)CCN3C(=O)c(cc1c2)[nH]c1ccc2Cl
- InChI: InChI=1S/C14H16ClN3O/c1-17-4-6-18(7-5-17)14(19)13-9-10-8-11(15)2-3-12(10)16-13/h2-3,8-9,16H,4-7H2,1H3; Key:HUQJRYMLJBBEDO-UHFFFAOYSA-N

JNJ-7777120 was a drug being developed by Johnson & Johnson Pharmaceutical Research & Development which acts as a potent and selective antagonist at the histamine H_{4} receptor. It has anti-inflammatory effects, and has been demonstrated to be superior to traditional (H1) antihistamines in the treatment of pruritus (itching). The drug was abandoned because of its short in vivo half-life and hypoadrenocorticism toxicity in rats and dogs, that prevented advancing it into clinical studies.

== See also ==
- VUF-6002
