= Clobenpropit =

Chemical compound

Clinical data
- ATC code: None

Legal status
- Legal status: US: Investigational New Drug

Identifiers
- IUPAC name: N'-[(4-chlorophenyl)methyl]-1-[3-(3H-imidazol-4-yl)propylsulfanyl]formamidine
- CAS Number: 145231-45-4
- PubChem CID: 2790
- IUPHAR/BPS: 1223
- ChemSpider: 2688
- UNII: RKU631JF4H
- ChEMBL: ChEMBL14690
- CompTox Dashboard (EPA): DTXSID3043738

Chemical and physical data
- Formula: C_{14}H_{17}ClN_{4}S
- Molar mass: 308.83 g·mol^{−1}
- 3D model (JSmol): Interactive image
- SMILES: C1=CC(=CC=C1CN=C(N)SCCCC2=CN=CN2)Cl

Clobenpropit is a histamine H_{3} receptor antagonist. It has neuroprotective effects via stimulation of GABA release in brain cells in vitro.
