= Thioperamide =

Chemical compound

Clinical data
- ATC code: none

Identifiers
- IUPAC name: N-Cyclohexyl-4-(1H-imidazol-4-yl)piperidine-1-carbothioamide
- CAS Number: 106243-16-7
- PubChem CID: 3035905
- IUPHAR/BPS: 1267
- ChemSpider: 2300031
- UNII: II4319BWUI
- ChEMBL: ChEMBL260374
- CompTox Dashboard (EPA): DTXSID50147555

Chemical and physical data
- Formula: C_{15}H_{24}N_{4}S
- Molar mass: 292.45 g·mol^{−1}
- 3D model (JSmol): Interactive image
- SMILES: S=C(NC1CCCCC1)N3CCC(c2cnc[nH]2)CC3
- InChI: InChI=1S/C15H24N4S/c20-15(18-13-4-2-1-3-5-13)19-8-6-12(7-9-19)14-10-16-11-17-14/h10-13H,1-9H2,(H,16,17)(H,18,20); Key:QKDDJDBFONZGBW-UHFFFAOYSA-N

Thioperamide is a potent HRH_{4} antagonist and selective HRH_{3} antagonist capable of crossing the blood–brain barrier. It was used by Jean-Charles Schwartz in his early experiments regarding the H_{3} receptor. Thioperamide was found to be an antagonist of histamine autoreceptors, which negatively regulate the release of histamine. The drug enhances the activity of histaminergic neurons by blocking autoreceptors, leading to greater release of histamine.

Its action on H_{3} receptors is thought to promote wakefulness and improve memory consolidation.

== See also ==
- H_{3} receptor antagonist
