= Ciproxifan =

Chemical compound

Clinical data
- ATC code: none

Identifiers
- IUPAC name: cyclopropyl 4-(3-(1H-imidazol-4-yl)propyloxy)phenyl ketone
- CAS Number: 184025-19-2
- PubChem CID: 6422124
- IUPHAR/BPS: 1265
- ChemSpider: 4927646
- UNII: 5EVQ7IRG99
- ChEMBL: ChEMBL14638
- CompTox Dashboard (EPA): DTXSID50171532

Chemical and physical data
- Formula: C_{16}H_{18}N_{2}O_{2}
- Molar mass: 270.332 g·mol^{−1}
- 3D model (JSmol): Interactive image
- SMILES: C1CC1C(=O)C2=CC=C(C=C2)OCCCC3=CN=CN3
- InChI: InChI=1S/C16H18N2O2/c19-16(12-3-4-12)13-5-7-15(8-6-13)20-9-1-2-14-10-17-11-18-14/h5-8,10-12H,1-4,9H2,(H,17,18); Key:ACQBHJXEAYTHCY-UHFFFAOYSA-N

Ciproxifan is an extremely potent histamine H_{3} inverse agonist/antagonist.

The histamine H_{3} receptor is an inhibitory autoreceptor located on histaminergic nerve terminals, and is believed to be involved in modulating the release of histamine in the brain. Histamine has an excitatory effect in the brain via H_{1} receptors in the cerebral cortex, and so drugs such as ciproxifan which block the H_{3} receptor and consequently allow more histamine to be released have an alertness-promoting effect.

Ciproxifan produces wakefulness and attentiveness in animal studies, and produced cognitive enhancing effects without prominent stimulant effects at relatively low levels of receptor occupancy, and pronounced wakefulness at higher doses. It has therefore been proposed as a potential treatment for sleep disorders such as narcolepsy and to improve vigilance in old age, particularly in the treatment of conditions such as Alzheimer's disease. It also potentiated the effects of antipsychotic drugs, and has been suggested as an adjuvant treatment for schizophrenia.
