= Histamine H1 receptor =

Histamine receptor

HRH1
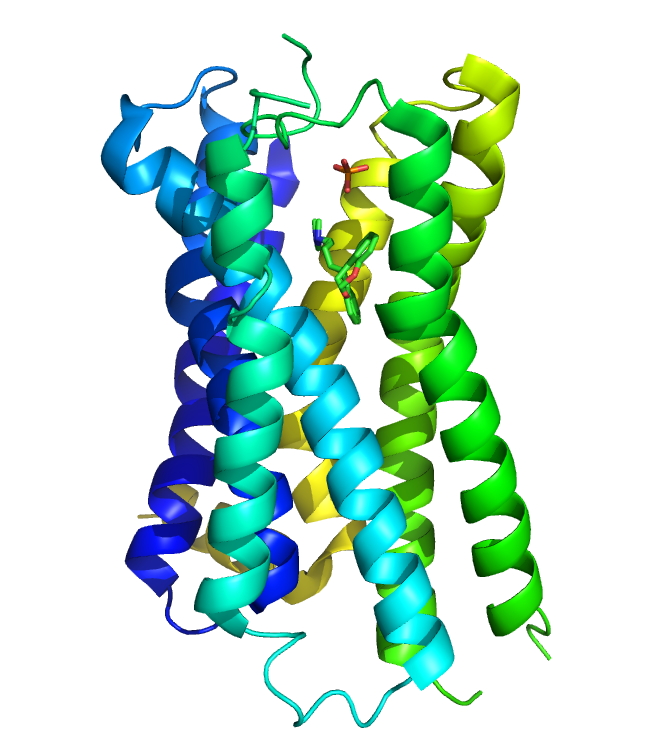

Identifiers
- Aliases: HRH1, H1-R, H1R, HH1R, hisH1, histamine receptor H1
- External IDs: OMIM: 600167; MGI: 107619; GeneCards: HRH1
Available structures
PDB	Ortholog search: PDBe RCSB
PDB	List of PDB id codes 3RZE

Gene location (Human)
Chr.	Chromosome 3 (human)
Band	3p25.3	Start	11,137,093 bp
Band	3p25.3	End	11,263,557 bp

Gene location (Mouse)
Chr.	Chromosome 6 (mouse)
Band	6 E3|6 53.05 cM	Start	114,374,897 bp
Band	6 E3|6 53.05 cM	End	114,460,257 bp
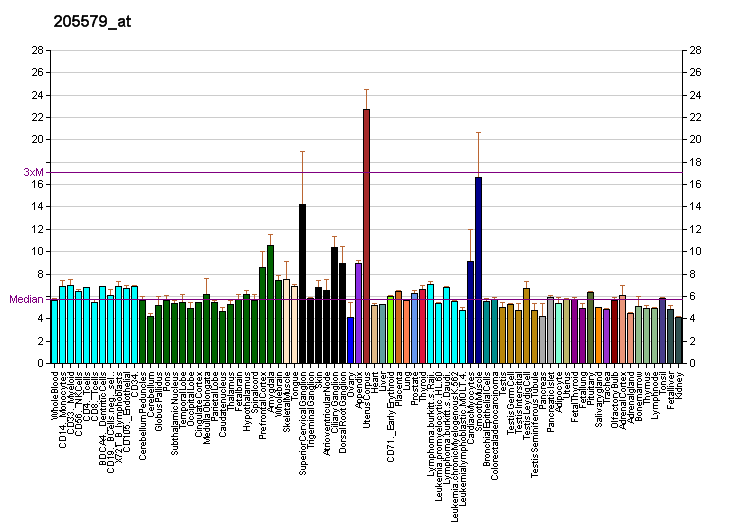

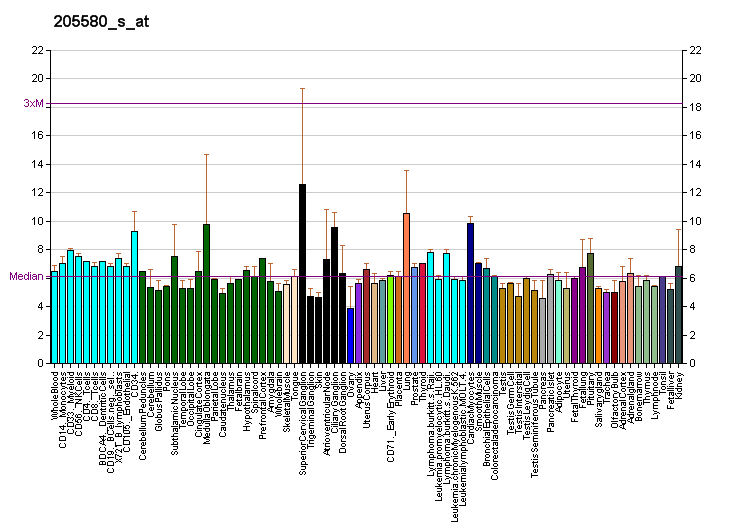
RNA expression pattern
Bgee	Human / Mouse (ortholog); Top expressed in: cartilage tissue; tendon of biceps brachii; Descending thoracic aorta; Achilles tendon; mucosa of urinary bladder; synovial membrane; ascending aorta; synovial joint; stromal cell of endometrium; endothelial cell / Top expressed in: lumbar subsegment of spinal cord; ventromedial nucleus; supraoptic nucleus; paraventricular nucleus of hypothalamus; arcuate nucleus; anterior amygdaloid area; suprachiasmatic nucleus; pontine nuclei; dorsomedial hypothalamic nucleus; medial dorsal nucleus; More reference expression data
BioGPS	More reference expression data
Gene ontology
Molecular function	histamine receptor activity; signal transducer activity; G protein-coupled receptor activity; G protein-coupled serotonin receptor activity; neurotransmitter receptor activity
Cellular component	integral component of membrane; membrane; integral component of plasma membrane; plasma membrane; cytosol; dendrite
Biological process	eosinophil chemotaxis; inositol phosphate-mediated signaling; regulation of vasoconstriction; positive regulation of inositol trisphosphate biosynthetic process; cellular response to histamine; regulation of vascular permeability; phospholipase C-activating G protein-coupled receptor signaling pathway; regulation of synaptic plasticity; G protein-coupled receptor signaling pathway; modulation of chemical synaptic transmission; inflammatory response; visual learning; signal transduction; memory; positive regulation of vasoconstriction; G protein-coupled receptor signaling pathway, coupled to cyclic nucleotide second messenger; chemical synaptic transmission; G protein-coupled serotonin receptor signaling pathway
Sources:Amigo / QuickGO
Orthologs
Databases	NCBI: entry; OMA: entry
Species	Human	Mouse
Entrez	3269	15465
Ensembl	ENSG00000196639	ENSMUSG00000053004
UniProt	P35367	P70174
RefSeq (mRNA)	NM_000861; NM_001098211; NM_001098212; NM_001098213	NM_001252642; NM_001252643; NM_008285; NM_001317124; NM_001317125 NM_001317126
RefSeq (protein)	NP_000852; NP_001091681; NP_001091682; NP_001091683	NP_001239571; NP_001239572; NP_001304053; NP_001304054; NP_001304055 NP_032311
Location (UCSC)	Chr 3: 11.14 – 11.26 Mb	Chr 6: 114.37 – 114.46 Mb
PubMed search
- Wikidata
View/Edit Human	View/Edit Mouse

The H_{1} receptor is a histamine receptor belonging to the family of rhodopsin-like G-protein-coupled receptors. This receptor is activated by the biogenic amine histamine. It is expressed in smooth muscles, on vascular endothelial cells, in the heart, and in the central nervous system. The H_{1} receptor is linked to an intracellular G-protein (G_{q}) that activates phospholipase C and the inositol triphosphate (IP3) signalling pathway. Antihistamines, which act on this receptor, are used as anti-allergy drugs. The crystal structure of the receptor has been determined (shown on the right/below) and used to discover new histamine H_{1} receptor ligands in structure-based virtual screening studies.

== Function ==
The expression of NF-κB, the transcription factor that regulates inflammatory processes, is promoted by the constitutive activity of the H_{1} receptor as well as by agonists that bind at the receptor. H_{1}-antihistamines have been shown to attenuate NF-κB expression and mitigate certain inflammatory processes in associated cells.

== Neurophysiology ==
Histamine H_{1} receptors are activated by endogenous histamine, which is released by neurons that have their cell bodies in the tuberomammillary nucleus of the hypothalamus. The histaminergic neurons of the tuberomammillary nucleus become active during the 'wake' cycle, firing at approximately 2 Hz; during slow wave sleep, this firing rate drops to approximately 0.5 Hz. Finally, during REM sleep, histaminergic neurons stop firing altogether. It has been reported that histaminergic neurons have the most wake-selective firing pattern of all known neuronal types.

The tuberomammillary nucleus is a histaminergic nucleus that strongly regulates the sleep-wake cycle. H_{1}-antihistamines that cross the blood–brain barrier inhibit H_{1} receptor activity on neurons that project from the tuberomammillary nucleus. This action is responsible for the drowsiness effect associated with these drugs.

== SARS-CoV-2 ==
A recent study published in August 2024 suggested that H1 receptor can act as an alternative entry point for the SARS-CoV-2 (COVID-19) virus to infect cells, in addition to the main receptor ACE2. HRH1 also synergistically enhanced hACE2-dependent viral entry by interacting with hACE2. Antihistamine drugs effectively prevent viral infection by competitively binding to HRH1, thereby disrupting the interaction between the spike protein and its receptor.

== See also ==
- Antihistamine – Histamine receptor antagonists
- H_{1}-receptor antagonist
- Histamine H_{2}-receptor
- Histamine H_{3}-receptor
- Histamine H_{4}-receptor
