= Organic cation transport protein =

Family of transport proteins

An organic cation transport protein mediates the transport of organic cations across the cell membrane. These proteins are members of the solute carrier family, subfamily 22. This family of proteins can also transport zwitterions and anions, though it is a different subfamily of solute carrier proteins than the organic anion transporters.

== Function ==
Organic cation transport proteins (OCTs) are involved in membrane transport through facilitated diffusion of organic cations and some weak bases. They are crucial for the disposal of many organic cations that come from drugs or other environmental sources. They also allow for the recycling of necessary organic cations. Some of these organic cation transport proteins are compound-specific, and others transport a broad range of cations across the membrane. For example, the disposing of the blood sugar medication Metformin is dependent on organic cation transport proteins^{[1]}.

== Structure ==
The general structure of an OCT or OCTN consists of 11-12 alpha-helical transmembrane protein domains. These create a transmembrane unit that creates loops on both sides of the membrane. There is typically a large extracellular loop with glycosylation sites at the beginning of the transporter, followed by many smaller loops that connect the transmembrane protein domains on the extracellular side. The loops found on the inside of the cell contain many sites for phosphorylation^{[2]}. There is also an intracellular loop between the transmembrane domains 6 and 7 that contains phosphorylation sites that are believed to contribute to regulation of activity of the organic cation transport protein. Some of these phosphorylation sites are shared between the different organic cation transport proteins^{[3]}.

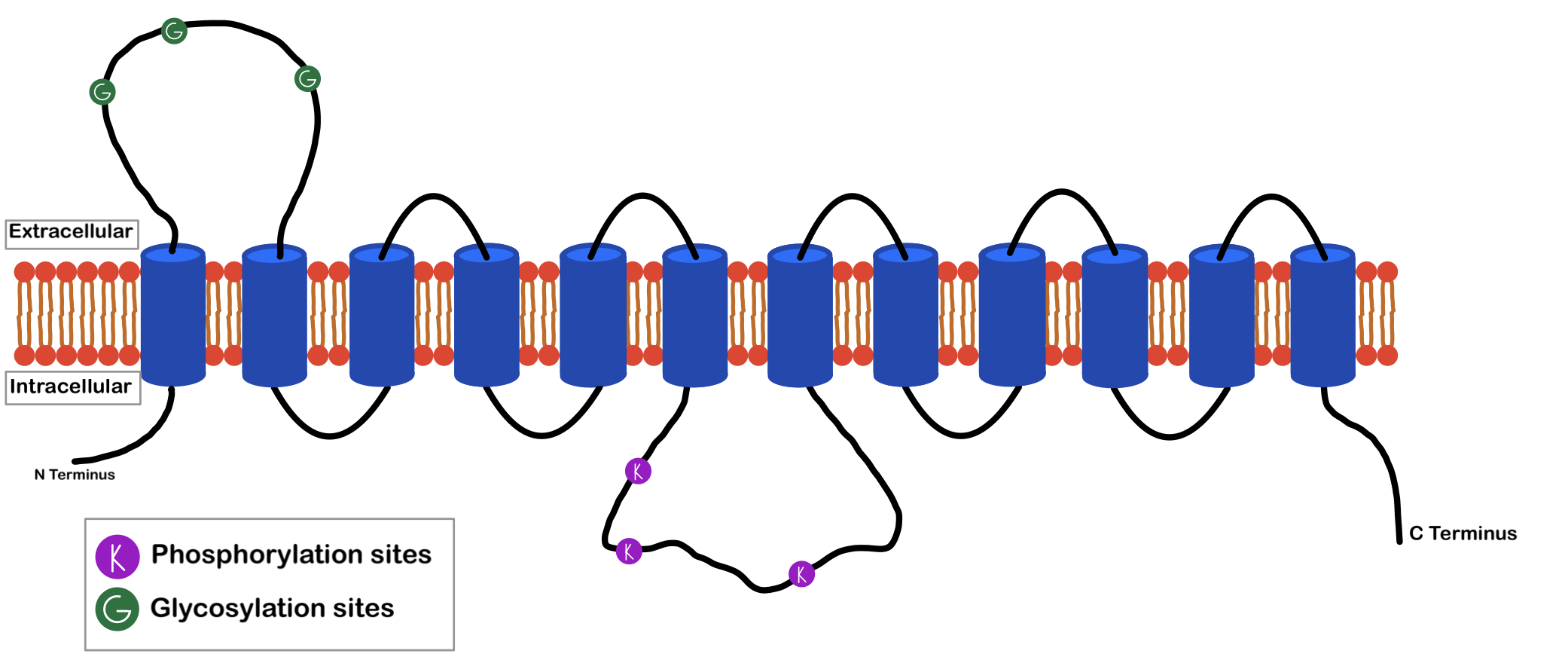
OCT structure

== Nomenclature ==
The various types of organic cation transport proteins are often referred to in its respective abbreviated form or by the gene that codes it. For example, OCT1 is coded by the SLC22A1 gene. Similarly, OCT2 is often called SLC22A2.

== Proteins ==
Abbreviation	Protein name	Location	Transported solute(s)	Associated disorder(s)
SLC22A1	Solute carrier family 22 member 1	Liver, brain (cerebellum)		
SLC22A2	Solute carrier family 22 member 2	Primarily in kidney, also in brain		
SLC22A3	Solute carrier family 22 member 3	Brain and kidney	Histamine, dopamine, serotonin, norepinephrine, MPP^{+}	
SLC22A4	Solute carrier family 22 member 4		Sodium ion and ergothioneine	
SLC22A5	Solute carrier family 22 member 5			Primary carnitine deficiency
SLC22A6	Solute carrier family 22 member 6			
SLC22A7	Solute carrier family 22 member 7			
SLC22A8	Solute carrier family 22 member 8			
SLC22A9	Solute carrier family 22 member 9			
SLC22A10	Solute carrier family 22 member 10			
SLC22A11	Solute carrier family 22 member 11			
SLC22A12	Solute carrier family 22 member 12	Kidney	Uric acid	Hyperuricemia and hypouricemia
SLC22A13	Solute carrier family 22 member 13			
SLC22A14	Solute carrier family 22 member 14			
SLC22A15	Solute carrier family 22 member 15			
SLC22A16	Solute carrier family 22 member 16			
SLC22A17	Solute carrier family 22 member 17			
SLC22A18	Solute carrier family 22 member 18			Beckwith-Wiedemann syndrome, Wilms tumor, rhabdomyosarcoma, adrenocortical carcinoma, and lung, ovarian, and breast cancer
SLC22A19	Solute carrier family 22 member 19			
SLC22A20	Solute carrier family 22 member 20			
