= Fluorothreonine transaldolase =

Enzyme

Identifiers
- EC no.: 2.2.1.8

Databases
- IntEnz: IntEnz view
- BRENDA: BRENDA entry
- ExPASy: NiceZyme view
- KEGG: KEGG entry
- MetaCyc: metabolic pathway
- PRIAM: profile
- PDB structures: RCSB PDB PDBe PDBsum
Search
- PMC: articles
- PubMed: articles
- NCBI: proteins

Fluorothreonine transaldolase (EC 2.2.1.8) is an enzyme that catalyzes the chemical reaction

L-threonine
+
Fluoroacetaldehyde
4-Fluoro-L-threonine
+
Acetaldehyde

The two substrates of the enzyme characterised from Streptomyces cattleya are L-threonine and fluoroacetaldehyde. Its products are 4-fluoro-L-threonine and acetaldehyde.

This enzyme belongs to the family of transferases, specifically those transferring aldehyde or ketonic groups (transaldolases and transketolases, respectively). The systematic name of this enzyme class is fluoroacetaldehyde:L-threonine aldehydetransferase. It is pyridoxal phosphate dependent.
