= Omega-amidase =

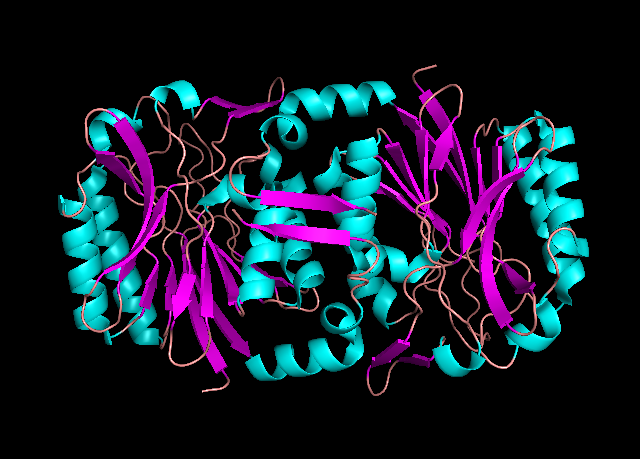
- A 3D cartoon depiction of the crystal structure of mouse nitrilase 2.

Identifiers
- EC no.: 3.5.1.3
- CAS no.: 9025-19-8

Databases
- IntEnz: IntEnz view
- BRENDA: BRENDA entry
- ExPASy: NiceZyme view
- KEGG: KEGG entry
- MetaCyc: metabolic pathway
- PRIAM: profile
- PDB structures: RCSB PDB PDBe PDBsum
- Gene Ontology: AmiGO / QuickGO
Search
- PMC: articles
- PubMed: articles
- NCBI: proteins

In enzymology, an omega-amidase (EC 3.5.1.3) is an enzyme that catalyzes the chemical reaction

a monoamide of a dicarboxylic acid + H_{2}O $\rightleftharpoons$ a dicarboxylate + NH_{3}

Thus, the two substrates of this enzyme are monoamide of a dicarboxylic acid and H_{2}O, whereas its two products are dicarboxylate and NH_{3}.

This enzyme belongs to the family of hydrolases, those acting on carbon-nitrogen bonds other than peptide bonds, specifically in linear amides. The systematic name of this enzyme class is omega-amidodicarboxylate amidohydrolase. This enzyme is also called alpha-keto acid-omega-amidase. This enzyme participates in glutamate metabolism and alanine and aspartate metabolism. This enzyme can be found in mammals, plants, and bacteria.

== Structure and active site ==
Omega-amidase has two independent monomers that have structure organizations similar to other nitrilase enzymes found in bacteria. Each monomer has a four layered alpha/beta/beta/alpha conformation. The enzyme is asymmetrical and contains a carbon-nitrogen hydrolase fold.

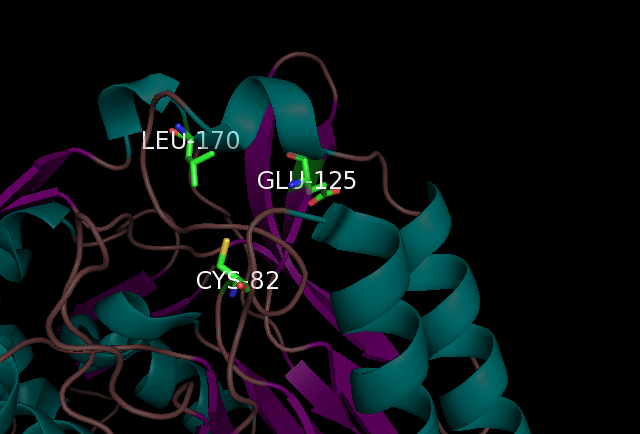
Theoretical active site based on the proximity of residues of the catalytic triad.

Just as omega-amidase shares a general structure organization as other nitrilases, omega-amidase also contains the same catalytic triad within the active site. This triad of residues includes a nucleophilic cysteine, a glutamate base, and a lysine, all of which are conserved within the structure. In addition to the catalytic triad, omega-amidase also contains a second glutamate that assists in substrate positioning. This second glutamate is why omega-amidase has no activity with glutamine or asparagine, even though they are sized similarly to typical substrates.

== Mechanism ==
Omega amidase catalyzes the deamidation of several different alpha-keto acids into ammonia and metabolically useful carboxylic acids The general mechanism is the same as for other nitrilases: binding of the substrate to the active site, followed by release of ammonia, formation of a thioester intermediate at the cysteine, binding of water and then release of the carboxylic acid product. Specifically, the active site cysteine acts as a nucleophile and binds to the substrate. The catalytic triad glutamate transfers a proton to the amide group to create and release ammonia. The remaining thioester intermediate is stabilized by the lysine and the backbone amino group following the cysteine. This intermediate is attacked by water to form a stable tetrahedral intermediate. This intermediate breaks down to release the carboxylic acid and restore the enzyme.

== Biology ==
Omega-amidase operates in coordination with glutamine transaminase to finish off the methionine salvage cycle in bacteria and plants. In the last step to obtain methionine from α-ketomethylthiobutyrate(KMTB), glutamine transaminase K(GTK) converts glutamine to α-ketoglutaramate(KGM). KGM is the main substrate for omega amidase, but KGM exists mainly in the ring form at physiological conditions. Omega-amidase has a higher affinity for the open linear form of KGM that forms more readily at pH 8.5. GTK catalyzes a reversible reaction, but coupling it with omega-amidase makes the transamination reaction irreversible at physiological conditions.

Due to omega-amidase's ability to convert toxic substrates like KGM into components that can be used by other processes, this enzyme can be considered a repair enzyme. Some such substrates are linked to diseases or conditions such as hyperammonemia. A list of some of the substrates that omega-amidase catalyzes may be found in Table 1.

Table 1. Substrate/Product pairs catalyzed by omega-amidase
Substrate	Product
α-Ketoglutaramate	α-Ketoglutarate
α-Ketosuccinamate	Oxaloacetate
L-2-Hydroxysuccinamate	L-Malate
Succinamic Acid	Succinylmonohydroxamic Acid
Glutaramic Acid	Glutarylmonohyoxamic Acid

== Medical relevance ==
The NIT2 gene in humans has been found to be identical to omega-amidase. The gene has the highest expression in the liver and kidney, but is also expressed in almost every human tissue. Overexpression of the NIT2 gene results in decreasing cell proliferation and growth in HeLa cells, which indicates that the gene may have a role in tumor suppression. However further studies are necessary to determine the effect on specific cancers, as a study done with colon cancer cells showed that downregulation of NIT2 induced cell cycle arrest. In addition to tumor suppression, NIT2/omega-amidase may be useful for detection and conversion of oncometabolites. Because omega-amidase is able to control concentration of toxic substrates such as KGM, it is likely that NIT2 can serve the same purpose.
