= C16H19ClN2 =

The molecular formula C_{16}H_{19}ClN_{2} (molar mass: 274.79 g/mol, exact mass: 274.1237 u) may refer to:

- Chlorphenamine, or chlorpheniramine
- Dexchlorpheniramine
