= Cyanoalanine nitrilase =

Class of enzymes

Identifiers
- EC no.: 3.5.5.4
- CAS no.: 85638-44-4

Databases
- BRENDA: enzyme data
- ExPASy: NiceZyme view
- KEGG: enzyme entry
- MetaCyc: metabolic pathway
- Rhea: reactions
- PDB structures: RCSB PDB PDBe PDBsum
- Gene Ontology: AmiGO / QuickGO
Search
- PMC: articles
- PubMed: articles
- NCBI: proteins

Cyanoalanine nitrilase (EC 3.5.5.4) is an enzyme characterised from Pseudomonas species that catalyzes the hydrolysis of cyanoalanine to aspartic acid and ammonia:

cyanoalanine
2 H_{2}O
NH_{3}
aspartic acid

This enzyme is a hydrolase, one acting on carbon-nitrogen bonds other than peptide bonds, specifically in nitriles. The systematic name of this enzyme class is 3-cyano-L-alanine aminohydrolase. This enzyme is also called beta-cyanoalanine nitrilase.
