= OCT1 =

OCT1 may refer to:

== Proteins ==
- SLC22A1 (solute carrier family 22 member 1)
- POU2F1 (POU domain, class 2, transcription factor 1)

== Date ==
- October 1
