= 3H domain =

Protein domain

3H
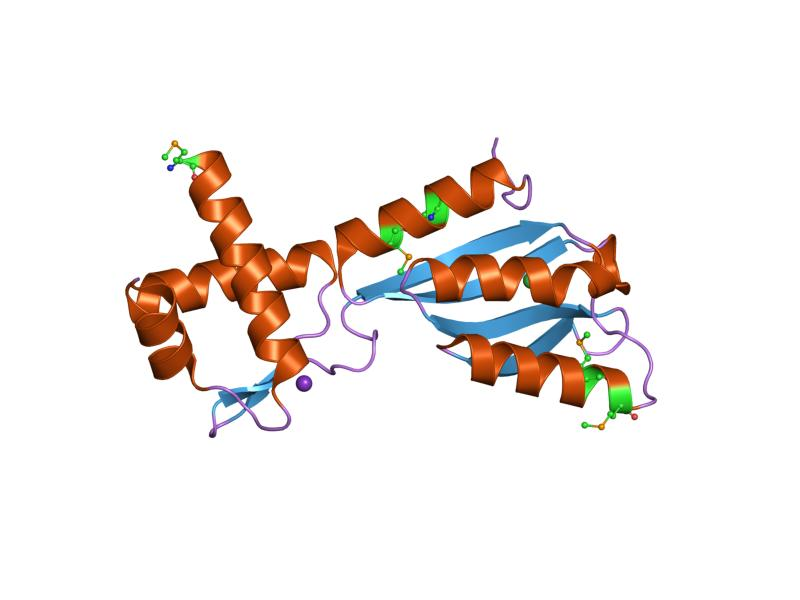
- crystal structure of transcriptional regulator (tm1602) from thermotoga maritima at 2.3 a resolution

Identifiers
- Symbol: 3H
- Pfam: PF02829
- InterPro: IPR004173
- PROSITE: PDOC00449
- SCOP2: 1j5y / SCOPe / SUPFAM
Available protein structures:
- PDB: IPR004173 PF02829 (ECOD; PDBsum)
- AlphaFold: IPR004173; PF02829

In molecular biology, the 3H domain is a protein domain named after its three highly conserved histidine residues. The 3H domain appears to be a small molecule-binding domain, based on its occurrence with other domains. Several proteins carrying this domain are transcriptional regulators from the biotin repressor family. The transcription regulator TM1602 from Thermotoga maritima is a DNA-binding protein thought to belong to a family of de novo NAD synthesis pathway regulators. TM1602 has an N-terminal DNA-binding domain and a C-terminal 3H regulatory domain. The N-terminal domain appears to bind to the NAD promoter region and repress the de novo NAD biosynthesis operon, while the C-terminal 3H domain may bind to nicotinamide, nicotinic acid, or other substrate/products. The 3H domain has a 2-layer alpha/beta sandwich fold.
