= Arhalofenate =

Identifiers
- IUPAC name: 2-acetamidoethyl (2R)-2-(4-chlorophenyl)-2-[3-(trifluoromethyl)phenoxy]acetate
- CAS Number: 24136-23-0
- PubChem CID: 12082259
- DrugBank: DB11811
- ChemSpider: 28528987
- UNII: 1P01UJR9X1
- KEGG: D09579
- ChEMBL: ChEMBL2103824
- CompTox Dashboard (EPA): DTXSID301347353
- ECHA InfoCard: 100.216.298

Chemical and physical data
- Formula: C_{19}H_{17}ClF_{3}NO_{4}
- Molar mass: 415.79 g·mol^{−1}
- 3D model (JSmol): Interactive image
- SMILES: CC(=O)NCCOC(=O)[C@@H](C1=CC=C(C=C1)Cl)OC2=CC=CC(=C2)C(F)(F)F
- InChI: InChI=InChI=1S/C19H17ClF3NO4/c1-12(25)24-9-10-27-18(26)17(13-5-7-15(20)8-6-13)28-16-4-2-3-14(11-16)19(21,22)23/h2-8,11,17H,9-10H2,1H3,(H,24,25)/t17-/m1/s1; Key:BJBCSGQLZQGGIQ-QGZVFWFLSA-N

Arhalofenate is a dual-acting small molecule being developed by CymaBay Therapeutics for the treatment of gout, offering both urate-lowering and anti-inflammatory effects. As a uricosuric agent, arhalofenate lowers serum urate by inhibiting its reabsorption in the proximal tubules of the kidney through blockade of transporters such as URAT1, OAT4, and OAT10. Arhalofenate also suppresses gout flares by inhibiting the urate crystal–stimulated release of interleukin-1β (IL-1β), the key cytokine responsible for triggering gout attacks.
