= C4H6N2O2 =

The molecular formula C_{4}H_{6}N_{2}O_{2} may refer to:

- Cyanoalanine, an uncommon amino acid
- Dihydrouracil, an intermediate in the catabolism of uracil
- 2,5-Diketopiperazine
- Ethyl diazoacetate, a reagent used in organic chemistry
- Muscimol, the major psychoactive alkaloid present in many mushrooms of the genus Amanita
