= 4-Chlorophenylacetonitrile =

Names
- Preferred IUPAC name (4-Chlorophenyl)acetonitrile
- Other names p-Chlorobenzyl cyanide

Identifiers
CAS Number	140-53-4
3D model (JSmol)	Interactive image
ChEBI	CHEBI:17346
ChemSpider	211145
ECHA InfoCard	100.004.927
EC Number	205-418-9
Gmelin Reference	1125640
KEGG	C03679
PubChem CID	241582
UNII	K2K7AKZ2Z7
CompTox Dashboard (EPA)	DTXSID8051708
- InChI: InChI=1S/C8H6ClN/c9-8-3-1-7(2-4-8)5-6-10/h1-4H,5H2 Key: IVYMIRMKXZAHRV-UHFFFAOYSA-N
- SMILES: C1=CC(=CC=C1CC#N)Cl

Properties
Chemical formula	C_{8}H_{6}ClN
Molar mass	151.59 g/mol
Density	1.19g/cm^{3}
Melting point	25–28 °C (77–82 °F; 298–301 K)
Boiling point	265–267 °C (509–513 °F; 538–540 K)
- Except where otherwise noted, data are given for materials in their standard state (at 25 °C [77 °F], 100 kPa). Infobox references

4-Chlorophenylacetonitrile (sometimes referred to as 4-chlorobenzyl cyanide) is an organic compound that serves as a useful synthetic intermediate in medicinal chemistry. It is a chlorinated derivative of benzyl cyanide. The compound has a wide range of applications in the pharmaceutical industry and is also used in the synthesis of pesticides. It is toxic if ingested or absorbed through the skin, and it acts as a chemical pollutant in the environment.

== Applications ==
=== Pharmaceuticals ===
4-Chlorophenylacetonitrile has been used in the synthesis of:

- Arhalofenate
- Chlorphenamine
- Clonitazene
- Dazadrol
- Lorcaserin
- Metaglidasen
- Pyrimethamine
- Sibutramine

=== Pesticides ===
4-Chlorophenylacetonitrile is sometimes used in the synthesis of 2-(4-chlorophenyl)-3-methyl butyric acid (aka fenvaleric acid [2012-74-0]). This has use in the synthesis of fenvalerate.

=== Fungicides ===
- Myclobutanil

== Synthesis ==
196 g (4 mol) of sodium cyanide, 12.5 g (40 mmol) of tributylbenzylammonium chloride and 660 mL of water are initially introduced into a 2 l multineck apparatus with reflux condenser, internal thermometer and dropping funnel, and the mixture is heated to 90 °C. At the same temperature, 644 g (4 mol) of molten 4-chlorobenzyl chloride are added dropwise in 1 hr, and the mixture is then stirred for 2 hr. After having been cooled to about 35 °C., the organic phase is separated off, washed with water and fractionated over a short column. 552 g of 4-chlorobenzyl cyanide (91% of theory) are obtained.

For alternative synthesis see:

== Reactions ==
- Hydrolysis of 4-chlorophenylacetonitrile gives 4-chlorophenylacetic acid [1878-66-6]. This has application in the synthesis of arhalofenate, clorindione, and metaglidasen
- Reduction of 4-chlorophenylacetonitrile gives 4-chlorophenethylamine [156-41-2]. This has application in the synthesis of lorcaserin.

== Toxicity ==
4-Chlorophenylacetonitrile exhibits significant acute toxicity across multiple exposure routes. Oral administration in rats shows an LD_{50} of 50 mg/kg, while intraperitoneal exposure in mice yields a lower LD_{50} of 27 mg/kg. Skin exposure in rabbits demonstrates toxicity at 200 mg/kg (lowest lethal dose). The compound is classified as Acute Toxicity Category 2-3 under GHS hazard statements, indicating fatal or toxic effects if swallowed, inhaled, or absorbed through skin. It causes severe eye irritation (H319) and skin irritation (H315), with additional respiratory risks from inhalation exposure (H335). Regulatory data emphasize its Toxic designation for all primary exposure pathways, requiring strict handling precautions.
