= Fluoroacetaldehyde dehydrogenase =

Identifiers
- EC no.: 1.2.1.69

Databases
- IntEnz: IntEnz view
- BRENDA: BRENDA entry
- ExPASy: NiceZyme view
- KEGG: KEGG entry
- MetaCyc: metabolic pathway
- PRIAM: profile
- PDB structures: RCSB PDB PDBe PDBsum
Search
- PMC: articles
- PubMed: articles
- NCBI: proteins

In enzymology, fluoroacetaldehyde dehydrogenase (EC 1.2.1.69) is an enzyme that catalyzes the chemical reaction

fluoroacetaldehyde
+ NAD^{+}
H_{2}O
H^{+}
H_{2}O
H^{+}
fluoroacetic acid
+ NADH

The three substrates of this enzyme are fluoroacetaldehyde, oxidised nicotinamide adenine dinucleotide (NAD^{+}), and water. Its products are fluoroacetic acid, reduced NADH, and a proton.

This enzyme belongs to the family of oxidoreductases, specifically those acting on the aldehyde or oxo group of donor with NAD+ or NADP+ as acceptor. The systematic name of this enzyme class is fluoroacetaldehyde:NAD+ oxidoreductase.
