= Nitrile hydratase =

Class of enzymes

nitrile hydratase

Identifiers
- EC no.: 4.2.1.84
- CAS no.: 82391-37-5

Databases
- IntEnz: IntEnz view
- BRENDA: BRENDA entry
- ExPASy: NiceZyme view
- KEGG: KEGG entry
- MetaCyc: metabolic pathway
- PRIAM: profile
- PDB structures: RCSB PDB PDBe PDBsum
- Gene Ontology: AmiGO / QuickGO
Search
- PMC: articles
- PubMed: articles
- NCBI: proteins

Nitrile hydratases (NHases; EC 4.2.1.84) are mononuclear iron or non-corrinoid cobalt enzymes that catalyse the hydration of diverse nitriles to their corresponding amides:

R-C≡N + H_{2}O → R-C(O)NH_{2}

== Metal cofactor ==
Nitrile hydratases use Fe(III) or Co(III) at their active sites. These ions are low-spin.

The cobalt-based nitrile hydratases are rare examples of enzymes that use cobalt. Cobalt, when it occurs in enzymes, is usually bound to a corrin ring, as in vitamin B_{12}.

The mechanism by which the cobalt is transported to NHase without causing toxicity is unclear, although a cobalt permease has been identified, which transports cobalt across the cell membrane. The identity of the metal in the active site of a nitrile hydratase can be predicted by analysis of the sequence data of the alpha subunit in the region where the metal is bound. The presence of the amino acid sequence VCTLC indicates a Co-centred NHase and the presence of VCSLC indicates Fe-centred NHase.

== Metabolic pathway ==
Nitrile hydratase and amidase are two hydrating and hydrolytic enzymes responsible for the sequential metabolism of nitriles in bacteria that are capable of utilising nitriles as their sole source of nitrogen and carbon, and in concert act as an alternative to nitrilase activity, which performs nitrile hydrolysis without formation of an intermediate primary amide. A sequence in genome of the choanoflagellate Monosiga brevicollis was suggested to encode for a nitrile hydratase. The M. brevicollis gene consisted of both the alpha and beta subunits fused into a single gene. Similar nitrile hydratase genes consisting of a fusion of the beta and alpha subunits have since been identified in several eukaryotic supergroups, suggesting that such nitrile hydratases were present in the last common ancestor of all eukaryotes.

== Industrial applications ==
NHases have been efficiently used for the industrial production of acrylamide from acrylonitrile on a scale of 600 000 tons per annum, and for removal of nitriles from wastewater. Photosensitive NHases intrinsically possess nitric oxide (NO) bound to the iron centre, and its photodissociation activates the enzyme. Nicotinamide is produced industrially by the hydrolysis of 3-cyanopyridine catalysed by the nitrile hydratase from Rhodococcus rhodochrous J1, producing 3500 tons per annum of nicotinamide for use in animal feed.

== Structure ==
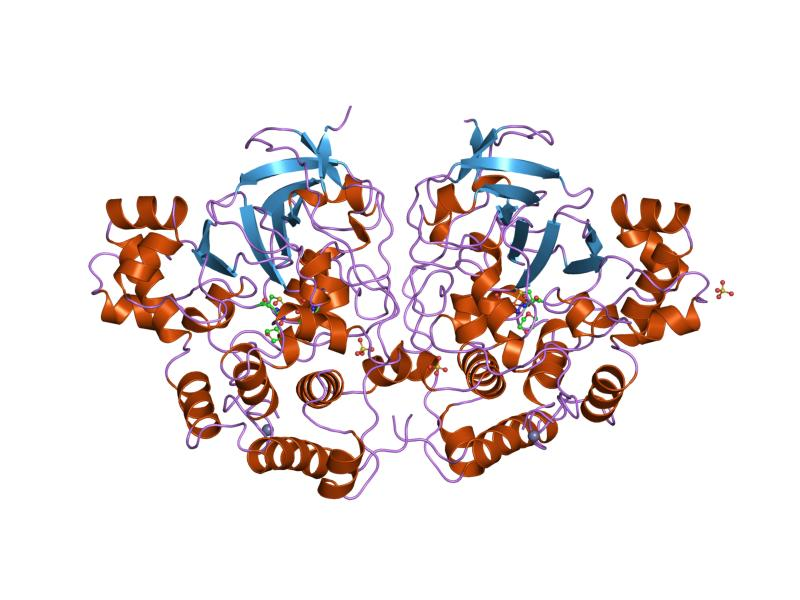
Structure of nitrile hydratase.

NHases are composed of two types of subunits, α and β, which are not related in amino acid sequence. NHases exist as αβ dimers or α_{2}β_{2} tetramers and bind one metal atom per αβ unit. The 3-D structures of a number of NHases have been determined. The α subunit consists of a long extended N-terminal "arm", containing two α-helices, and a C-terminal domain with an unusual four-layered structure (α-β-β-α). The β subunit consists of a long N-terminal loop that wraps around the α subunit, a helical domain that packs with N-terminal domain of the α subunit, and a C-terminal domain consisting of a β-roll and one short helix.

Nitrile hydratase, alpha chain

Identifiers
- Symbol: NHase_alpha
- Pfam: PF02979
- InterPro: IPR004232
- SCOP2: 2ahj / SCOPe / SUPFAM
Available protein structures:
- Pfam: structures / ECOD
- PDB: RCSB PDB; PDBe; PDBj
- PDBsum: structure summary
- PDB: 1ahj, 1ire, 1ugp, 1ugq, 1ugr, 1ugs, 1v29, 2ahj, 2cyz, 2cz0, 2cz1, 2cz6, 2cz7, 2d0q, 2qdy

Nitrile hydratase beta subunit

Identifiers
- Symbol: NHase_beta
- Pfam: PF02211
- InterPro: IPR003168
- SCOP2: 2ahj / SCOPe / SUPFAM
Available protein structures:
- Pfam: structures / ECOD
- PDB: RCSB PDB; PDBe; PDBj
- PDBsum: structure summary
- PDB: 1ahj, 1ire, 1ugp, 1ugq, 1ugr, 1ugs, 2ahj, 2cyz, 2cz0, 2cz1, 2cz6, 2cz7, 2d0q, 2dpp, 2qdy, 2zcf, 2zpb, 2zpe, 2zpf, 2zpg, 2zph, 2zpi

== Assembly ==
An assembly pathway for nitrile hydratase was first proposed when gel filtration experiments found that the complex exists in both αβ and α2β2 forms. In vitro experiments using mass spectrometry further revealed that the α and β subunits first assemble to form the αβ dimer. The dimers can then subsequently interact to form a tetramer.

== Mechanism ==
The metal centre is located in the central cavity at the interface between two subunits. All protein ligands to the metal atom are provided by the α subunit. The protein ligands to the iron are the sidechains of the three cysteine (Cys) residues and two mainchain amide nitrogens. The metal ion is octahedrally coordinated, with the protein ligands at the five vertices of an octahedron. The sixth position, accessible to the active site cleft, is occupied either by NO or by a solvent-exchangeable ligand (hydroxide or water). The two Cys residues coordinated to the metal are post-translationally modified to Cys-sulfinic (Cys-SO_{2}H) and -sulfenic (Cys-SOH) acids.

Quantum chemical studies predicted that the Cys-SOH residue might play a role as either a base (activating a nucleophilic water molecule) or as a nucleophile. Subsequently, the functional role of the SOH center as nucleophile has obtained experimental support.
