= NAD(+)—dinitrogen-reductase ADP-D-ribosyltransferase =

InterPro Family

NAD+-dinitrogen-reductase ADP-D-ribosyltransferase

Identifiers
- EC no.: 2.4.2.37
- CAS no.: 117590-45-1

Databases
- IntEnz: IntEnz view
- BRENDA: BRENDA entry
- ExPASy: NiceZyme view
- KEGG: KEGG entry
- MetaCyc: metabolic pathway
- PRIAM: profile
- PDB structures: RCSB PDB PDBe PDBsum
- Gene Ontology: AmiGO / QuickGO
Search
- PMC: articles
- PubMed: articles
- NCBI: proteins

In enzymology, a NAD+-dinitrogen-reductase ADP-D-ribosyltransferase (EC 2.4.2.37) is an enzyme that catalyzes the chemical reaction

NAD^{+} + [dinitrogen reductase] $\rightleftharpoons$ nicotinamide + ADP-D-ribosyl-[dinitrogen reductase]

Thus, the two substrates of this enzyme are NAD^{+} and dinitrogen reductase, whereas its two products are nicotinamide and ADP-D-ribosyl-[dinitrogen reductase].

This enzyme belongs to the family of glycosyltransferases, specifically the pentosyltransferases. The systematic name of this enzyme class is NAD+:[dinitrogen reductase] (ADP-D-ribosyl)transferase. Other names in common use include NAD-azoferredoxin (ADPribose)transferase, and NAD-dinitrogen-reductase ADP-D-ribosyltransferase.
