= Nicotinonitrile =

Names
- Preferred IUPAC name Pyridine-3-carbonitrile

Identifiers
CAS Number	100-54-9
3D model (JSmol)	Interactive image
ChEBI	CHEBI:86556
ChEMBL	ChEMBL3181972
ChemSpider	78
ECHA InfoCard	100.002.603
EC Number	202-863-0
PubChem CID	79
UNII	X64V0K6260
CompTox Dashboard (EPA)	DTXSID1026665
- InChI: InChI=1S/C6H4N2/c7-4-6-2-1-3-8-5-6/h1-3,5H Key: GZPHSAQLYPIAIN-UHFFFAOYSA-N
- SMILES: C1=CC(=CN=C1)C#N

Properties
Chemical formula	C_{6}H_{4}N_{2}
Molar mass	104.112 g·mol^{−1}
Density	1.1590
Melting point	51 °C (124 °F; 324 K)
Boiling point	206.9 °C (404.4 °F; 480.0 K)
Vapor pressure	0.296 mm Hg

Structure
Crystal structure	Monoclinic
Space group	P2_{1}/c (No. 14)
Lattice constant	a = 3.808 Å, b = 13.120 Å, c = 10.591 Å α = 90°, β = 97.97°, γ = 90°
Lattice volume (V)	524
Formula units (Z)	4

Hazards
- GHS labelling
Pictograms	(GHS07: Exclamation mark)
Signal word	Warning
Hazard statements	H302, H315, H319, H335
Precautionary statements	P261, P264, P270, P271, P280, P301+P312, P302+P352, P304+P340, P305+P351+P338, P312, P321, P330, P332+P313, P337+P313, P362, P403+P233, P405, P501
- Except where otherwise noted, data are given for materials in their standard state (at 25 °C [77 °F], 100 kPa). Infobox references

Nicotinonitrile or 3-cyanopyridine is an organic compound with the formula NCC_{5}H_{4}N. The molecule consists of a pyridine ring with a nitrile group attached to the 3-position. A colorless solid, it is produced by ammoxidation of 3-methylpyridine:

H_{3}CC_{5}H_{4}N + NH_{3} + 1.5 O_{2} → NCC_{5}H_{4}N + 3 H_{2}O

Nicotinonitrile is a precursor to the vitamin niacin.

Nitrilase-catalyzed hydrolysis of 3-cyanopyridine by means of immobilized Rhodococcus rhodochrous J1 strains leads in quantitative yield to nicotinamide (vitamin B_{3}). The enzyme allows for a more selective synthesis as further hydrolysis of the amide to nicotinic acid is avoided.

Oxidation of 3-cyanopyridine with hydrogen peroxide gives 3-cyanopyridine-N-oxide, which hydrolyzes to nicotinic acid N-oxide, a precursor to pharmaceuticals.
