= C5H7NO3 =

The molecular formula C_{5}H_{7}NO_{3} (molar mass : 129.11 g/mol) may refer to:

- Pyroglutamic acid
- β-Ethynylserine
