= Nicotinic acid N-oxide =

Names
- IUPAC name 1-oxidopyridin-1-ium-3-carboxylic acid
- Other names Oxiniacic acid

Identifiers
CAS Number	2398-81-4
3D model (JSmol)	Interactive image
ChEBI	CHEBI:134763
ChEMBL	ChEMBL1591725
ChemSpider	16082
ECHA InfoCard	100.017.515
EC Number	219-265-0
PubChem CID	16976
UNII	YY03Q39E6L
CompTox Dashboard (EPA)	DTXSID2046543
- InChI: InChI=1S/C6H5NO3/c8-6(9)5-2-1-3-7(10)4-5/h1-4H,(H,8,9) Key: FJCFFCXMEXZEIM-UHFFFAOYSA-N
- SMILES: C1=CC(=C[N+](=C1)[O-])C(=O)O

Properties
Chemical formula	C_{6}H_{5}NO_{3}
Molar mass	139.110 g·mol^{−1}
Appearance	colorless or white solid
Melting point	254.5 °C (490.1 °F; 527.6 K)

Hazards
- GHS labelling
Pictograms	(GHS07: Exclamation mark)
Signal word	Warning
Hazard statements	H312, H315, H319, H332
Precautionary statements	P261, P264, P271, P280, P302+P352, P304+P312, P304+P340, P305+P351+P338, P312, P321, P322, P332+P313, P337+P313, P362, P363, P501
- Except where otherwise noted, data are given for materials in their standard state (at 25 °C [77 °F], 100 kPa). Infobox references

Nicotinic acid N-oxide is an organic compound with the formula (HO_{2}C)C_{5}H_{4}NO. It is the amine oxide of nicotinic acid ((HO_{2}C)C_{5}H_{4}N). It is prepared by oxidation of nicotinic acid or the hydrolysis of 3-cyanopyridine-N-oxide. The compound is a precursor to the popular drugs niflumic acid and pranoprofen.
