= Arylacetonitrilase =

Class of enzymes

Identifiers
- EC no.: 3.5.5.5
- CAS no.: 132053-06-6

Databases
- BRENDA: enzyme data
- ExPASy: NiceZyme view
- KEGG: enzyme entry
- MetaCyc: metabolic pathway
- Rhea: reactions
- PDB structures: RCSB PDB PDBe PDBsum
- Gene Ontology: AmiGO / QuickGO
Search
- PMC: articles
- PubMed: articles
- NCBI: proteins

Arylacetonitrilase (EC 3.5.5.5) is an enzyme characterised from Alcaligenes faecalis that catalyzes the hydrolysis of 4-chlorophenylacetonitrile to 4-chlorophenylacetic acid and ammonia:

4-chlorophenylacetonitrile
2 H_{2}O
NH_{3}
4-chlorophenylacetic acid

This enzyme is a hydrolase, one acting on carbon-nitrogen bonds other than peptide bonds, specifically in nitriles. The systematic name of this enzyme class is arylacetonitrile aminohydrolase.
