= 4-Fluoro-L-threonine =

4-Fluoro-l-threonine

Names
- IUPAC name 4-Fluoro-L-threonine
- Systematic IUPAC name (2S,3S)-2-Amino-4-fluoro-3-hydroxybutanoic acid
- Other names 4-Fluorothreonine

Identifiers
| CAS Number | 102130-93-8 |
| 3D model (JSmol) | Interactive image |
| ChemSpider | 113553 |
| PubChem CID | 128057 |
| CompTox Dashboard (EPA) | DTXSID80144678 |
- InChI: InChI=1S/C4H8FNO3/c5-1-2(7)3(6)4(8)9/h2-3,7H,1,6H2,(H,8,9)/t2-,3+/m1/s1 Key: GTFWIYJIEXNAOL-GBXIJSLDSA-N; InChI=1/C4H8FNO3/c5-1-2(7)3(6)4(8)9/h2-3,7H,1,6H2,(H,8,9)/t2-,3+/m1/s1 Key: GTFWIYJIEXNAOL-GBXIJSLDBB
- SMILES: C([C@H]([C@@H](C(=O)O)N)O)F

Properties
| Chemical formula | C_{4}H_{8}FNO_{3} |
| Molar mass | 137.110 g·mol^{−1} |
- Except where otherwise noted, data are given for materials in their standard state (at 25 °C [77 °F], 100 kPa). Infobox references

4-Fluoro-l-threonine is an antibiotic produced by Streptomyces cattleya.

== Biosynthesis ==
The enzyme fluorothreonine transaldolase catalyzes the chemical reaction which converts the natural amino acid threonine to 4-fluoro-L-threonine in the Streptomyces cattleya.

L-threonine
+
Fluoroacetaldehyde
4-Fluoro-L-threonine
+
Acetaldehyde
