= Propargylglycine =

- L-Propargylglycine

Names
- IUPAC name (2S)-2-Aminopent-4-ynoic acid
- Other names 2-Propynylglycine

Identifiers
CAS Number	L: 23235-01-0; DL: 64165-64-6
3D model (JSmol)	L: Interactive image; DL: Interactive image
ChEBI	L: CHEBI:43797
ChEMBL	L: ChEMBL50483; DL: ChEMBL4795578
ChemSpider	L: 147039; DL: 86268
ECHA InfoCard	100.245.847
EC Number	L: 812-854-9
KEGG	L: C22138
PubChem CID	L: 168091; DL: 95575
UNII	L: 8R9U8RVT6V; DL: FU67PLJ48R
CompTox Dashboard (EPA)	DTXSID60941728; DL: DTXSID301033465
- InChI: L: InChI=1S/C5H7NO2/c1-2-3-4(6)5(7)8/h1,4H,3,6H2,(H,7,8)/t4-/m0/s1 Key: DGYHPLMPMRKMPD-BYPYZUCNSA-N; DL: InChI=1S/C5H7NO2/c1-2-3-4(6)5(7)8/h1,4H,3,6H2,(H,7,8) Key: DGYHPLMPMRKMPD-UHFFFAOYSA-N
- SMILES: L: C#CC[C@@H](C(=O)O)N; DL: C#CCC(C(=O)O)N

Properties
Chemical formula	C_{5}H_{7}NO_{2}
Molar mass	113.116 g·mol^{−1}
- Except where otherwise noted, data are given for materials in their standard state (at 25 °C [77 °F], 100 kPa). Infobox references

Propargylglycine is a non-proteinogenic amino acid found in a variety of organisms including Amanita mushrooms and the bacteria Streptomyces cattleya. It is a toxin that interferes with the metabolism of sulfur-containing amino acids via inhibition of cystathionine γ-lyase (also known as cystathionase or CSE).

== Structure and properties ==
Propargylglycine is a is non-proteinogenic amino acid that features an unusual terminal alkyne group. It is chemically related to β-ethynylserine, with which it shares a biosynthetic pathway, and to cyanoalanine. Propargylglycine is useful in click chemistry applications.

== Biological activity ==
Propargylglycine acts as an irreversible inhibitor of cystathionine γ-lyase (CSE), an enzyme that catalyzes the breakdown of cystathionine to cysteine and is involved in the endogenous production of hydrogen sulfide (H_{2}S). It functions as a mechanism-based inactivator, forming a covalent adduct with the enzyme's pyridoxal 5'-phosphate (PLP) cofactor. Due to its inhibition of CSE, propargylglycine is widely used as a research tool to study the biological roles of H_{2}S in processes such as vasodilation, inflammation, oxidative stress, and various disease models (e.g., hypertension, renal injury, myocardial protection, and hypoxic responses).

It also inhibits other PLP-dependent enzymes such as methionine γ-lyase (MGL) and alanine transaminase (ALT).
