= Chlorphenamine =

Antihistamine used to treat allergies

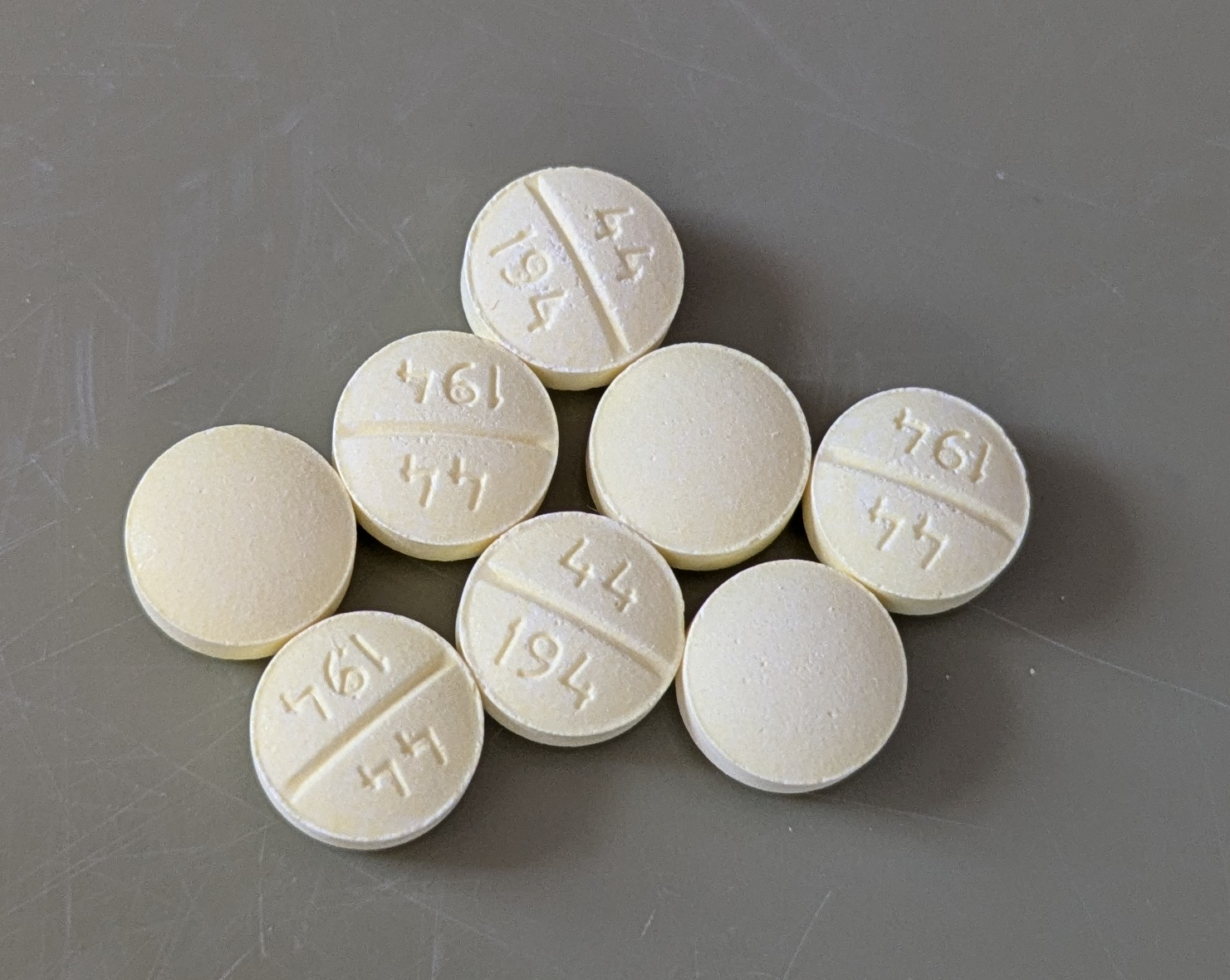

Clinical data
- Trade names: Chlor-Trimeton; Piriton; Chlor-Tripolon; Allergex
- AHFS/Drugs.com: Monograph
- MedlinePlus: a682543
- Pregnancy category: AU: A
- Routes of administration: Oral, intravenous, intramuscular, subcutaneous
- ATC code: R06AB04 (WHO)

Legal status
- Legal status: AU: S3 (Pharmacist only); UK: P (Pharmacy medicines); US: OTC; CN: OTC

Pharmacokinetic data
- Bioavailability: 25 to 50%
- Protein binding: 72%
- Metabolism: Liver (CYP2D6)
- Elimination half-life: 13.9–43.4 hours
- Excretion: Kidney

Identifiers
- IUPAC name: 3-(4-Chlorophenyl)-N,N-dimethyl-3-(pyridin-2-yl)-propan-1-amine
- CAS Number: 132-22-9
- PubChem CID: 2725
- IUPHAR/BPS: 1210
- DrugBank: DB01114
- ChemSpider: 2624
- UNII: 3U6IO1965U
- KEGG: D07398
- ChEBI: CHEBI:52010
- ChEMBL: ChEMBL505
- CompTox Dashboard (EPA): DTXSID0022804
- ECHA InfoCard: 100.004.596

Chemical and physical data
- Formula: C_{16}H_{19}ClN_{2}
- Molar mass: 274.79 g·mol^{−1}
- 3D model (JSmol): Interactive image
- Solubility in water: 0.55 g/100 mL, liquid mg/mL (20 °C)
- SMILES: Clc1ccc(cc1)C(c2ncccc2)CCN(C)C
- InChI: InChI=1S/C16H19ClN2/c1-19(2)12-10-15(16-5-3-4-11-18-16)13-6-8-14(17)9-7-13/h3-9,11,15H,10,12H2,1-2H3; Key:SOYKEARSMXGVTM-UHFFFAOYSA-N

Chlorphenamine (CP, CPM), also known as chlorpheniramine, is an antihistamine used to treat the symptoms of allergic conditions such as allergic rhinitis (hay fever). It is taken orally (by mouth). The medication takes effect within two hours and lasts for about 4–6 hours. It is a first-generation antihistamine and works by blocking the histamine H_{1} receptor.

Common side effects include sleepiness, restlessness, and weakness. Other side effects may include dry mouth and wheeziness.

Chlorpheniramine was patented in 1948 and came into medical use in 1949. It is available as a generic medication and over the counter.

In 2023, it was the 318th most commonly prescribed medication in the United States, with more than 200,000 prescriptions.

== Medical uses ==
=== Combination products ===
Chlorphenamine is often combined with phenylpropanolamine to form an allergy medication with both antihistamine and decongestant properties, although phenylpropanolamine was removed from the U.S. market per studies concluding that it increased the risk of stroke in young women. Vernate was a trade name of one such product available in the U.S. prior to the FDA ban; it was manufactured by Tutag and was among the medications prescribed to Elvis Presley.

In the drug Coricidin, chlorphenamine is combined with the cough suppressant dextromethorphan. In the drug Cêgripe, chlorphenamine is combined with the analgesic paracetamol (also known as acetaminophen, sold as Tylenol).

== Side effects ==
The adverse effects include drowsiness, dizziness, confusion, constipation, anxiety, nausea, blurred vision, restlessness, decreased coordination, dry mouth, shallow breathing, hallucinations, irritability, problems with memory or concentration, tinnitus and trouble urinating.

Chlorphenamine produces less sedation than other first-generation antihistamines.

A large study on people 65 years old or older linked the development of Alzheimer's disease and other forms of dementia to the "higher cumulative" use of chlorphenamine and other first-generation antihistamines, due to their anticholinergic properties. Chlorphenamine is rated as a "high burden" anticholinergic by experts on a semi-subjective scale. This is inconsistent with the in vitro experiments showing low affinity to muscarinic acetylcholine receptors (see below).

== Pharmacology ==
=== Pharmacodynamics ===
Chlorphenamine
| Site | K_{i} (nM) | Species | Ref |
|---|---|---|---|
| SERT | 15.2 | Human | |
| NET | 1,440 | Human | |
| DAT | 1,060 | Human | |
| 5-HT_{2A} | 3,130 | Rat | |
| 5-HT_{2C} | 3,120 | Rat | |
| H_{1} | 2.5–3.0 | Human | |
| H_{2} | ND | ND | ND |
| H_{3} | >10,000 | Rat | |
| H_{4} | 2,910 | Human | |
| M_{1} | 25,700 | Human | |
| M_{2} | 17,000 | Human | |
| M_{3} | 52,500 | Human | |
| M_{4} | 77,600 | Human | |
| M_{5} | 28,200 | Human | |
| hERG | 20,900 | Human | |
Values are K_{i}, unless otherwise noted. The smaller the value, the more strongly the drug binds to the site. Values at the mAChRs and hERG are IC_{50} (nM).

Chlorphenamine acts primarily as a potent H_{1} antihistamine. It is specifically a potent inverse agonist of the histamine H_{1} receptor. The drug is also commonly described as possessing weak anticholinergic activity by acting as an antagonist of the muscarinic acetylcholine receptors. The dextrorotatory stereoisomer, dexchlorpheniramine, has been reported to possess K_{d} values of 15 nM for the H_{1} receptor and 1,300 nM for the muscarinic acetylcholine receptors in human brain tissue. The smaller the K_{d} value, the greater the binding affinity of the ligand for its target.

In addition to acting as an inverse agonist at the H_{1} receptor, chlorphenamine has been found to act as a serotonin reuptake inhibitor (K_{d} = 15.2 nM for the serotonin transporter). It has only weak affinity for the norepinephrine and dopamine transporters (K_{d} = 1,440 nM and 1,060 nM, respectively).

A study found that dexchlorphenamine had K_{i} values for the human cloned H_{1} receptor of 2.67 to 4.81 nM while levchlorphenamine had K_{i} values of 211 to 361 nM for this receptor, indicating that dexchlorphenamine is the active enantiomer. Another study found that dexchlorphenamine had a K_{i} value of 20 to 30 μM for the muscarinic acetylcholine receptor using rat brain tissue while levchlorphenamine had a K_{i} value of 40 to 50 μM for this receptor, indicating that both enantiomers have very low affinity for it.

=== Pharmacokinetics ===
The elimination half-life of chlorphenamine has variously ranged between 13.9 and 43.4 hours in adults following a single dose in clinical studies.

== Chemistry ==
Chlorphenamine is an alkylamine and is a part of a series of antihistamines including pheniramine (Naphcon) and its halogenated derivatives including fluorpheniramine, dexchlorphenamine (Polaramine), brompheniramine (Dimetapp), dexbrompheniramine (Drixoral), deschlorpheniramine, and iodopheniramine. The halogenated alkylamine antihistamines all exhibit optical isomerism, and chlorphenamine in the indicated products is racemic chlorphenamine maleate, whereas dexchlorphenamine is the dextrorotary stereoisomer.

=== Synthesis ===
There are several patented methods for the synthesis of chlorphenamine. In one example, 4-chlorophenylacetonitrile is reacted with 2-chloropyridine in the presence of sodium amide to form 4-chlorophenyl(2-pyridyl)acetonitrile. Alkylating this with 2-dimethylaminoethylchloride in the presence of sodium amide gives γ-(4-chlorphenyl)-γ-cyano-N,N-dimethyl-2-pyridinepropanamine, the hydrolysis and decarboxylation of which lead to chlorphenamine.

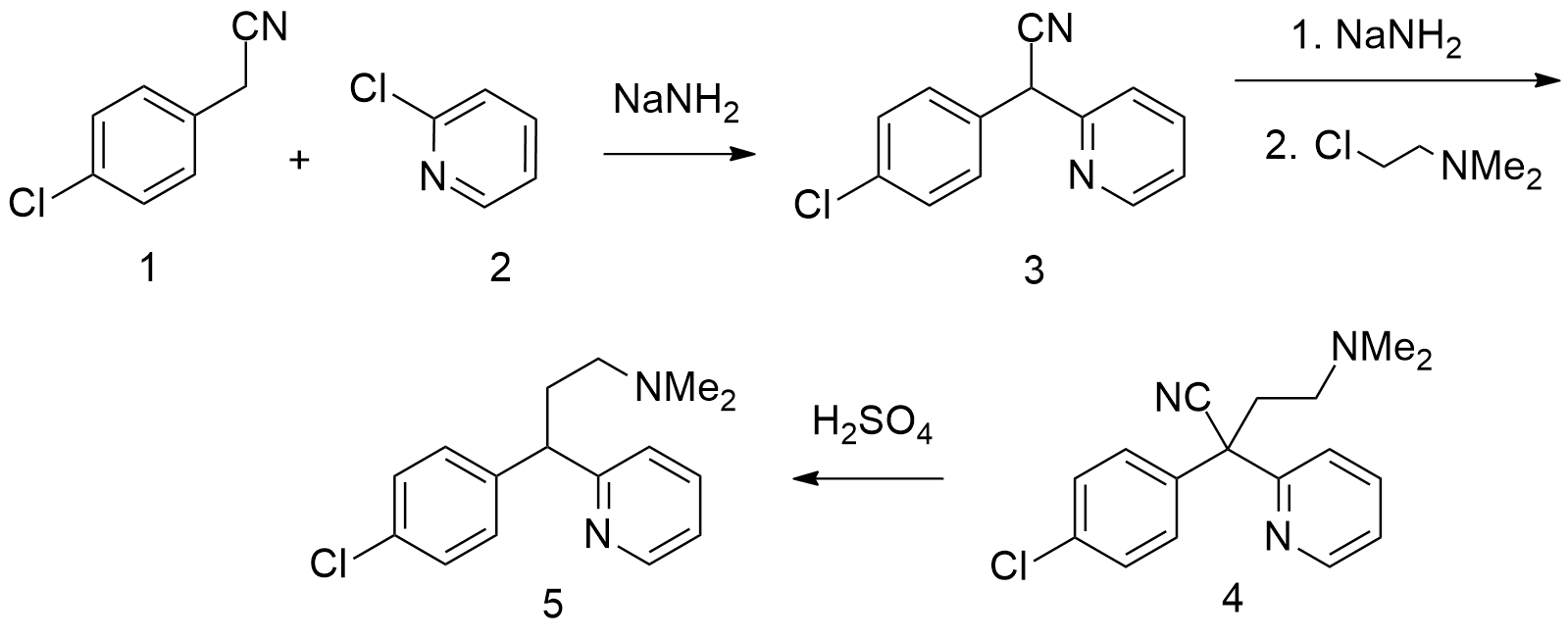
Chlorpheniramine synthesis

A second method boom starts from pyridine, which undergoes alkylation by 4-chlorophenylacetonitrile, giving 2-(4-chlorobenzyl)pyridine. Alkylating this with 2-dimethylaminoethylchloride in the presence of sodium amide gives chlorphenamine.

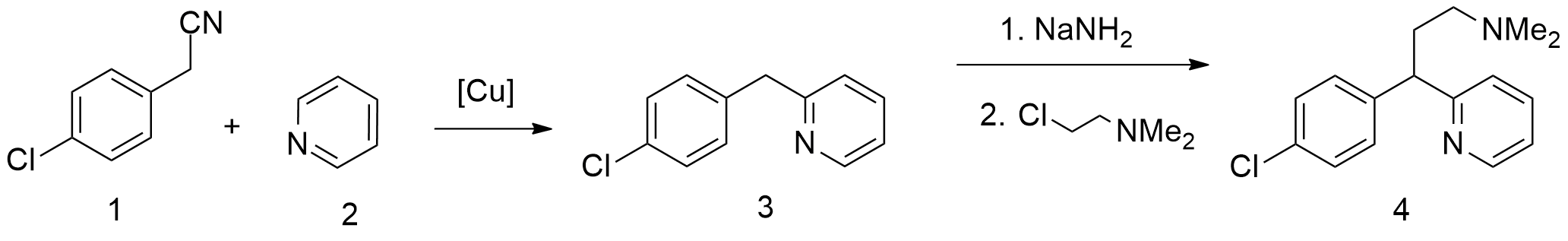
Chlorpheniramine synthesis

== Naming ==
=== Names ===
Chlorphenamine is the INN while chlorpheniramine is the USAN and former BAN.

Brand names include Chlor-Trimeton, Demazin, Allerest 12 Hour, Piriton, Chlorphen-12, Tylenol Cold/Allergy, and numerous others according to country.
