= L-3-cyanoalanine synthase =

Identifiers
- EC no.: 4.4.1.9
- CAS no.: 9059-53-4

Databases
- IntEnz: IntEnz view
- BRENDA: BRENDA entry
- ExPASy: NiceZyme view
- KEGG: KEGG entry
- MetaCyc: metabolic pathway
- PRIAM: profile
- PDB structures: RCSB PDB PDBe PDBsum
- Gene Ontology: AmiGO / QuickGO
Search
- PMC: articles
- PubMed: articles
- NCBI: proteins

The enzyme L-3-cyanoalanine synthase (EC 4.4.1.9) catalyzes the chemical reaction

L-cysteine + hydrogen cyanide $\rightleftharpoons$ L-3-cyanoalanine + hydrogen sulfide

This enzyme belongs to the family of lyases, specifically the class of carbon-sulfur lyases. The systematic name of this enzyme class is L-cysteine hydrogen-sulfide-lyase (adding hydrogen cyanide L-3-cyanoalanine-forming). Other names in common use include β-cyanoalanine synthase, β-cyanoalanine synthetase, β-cyano-L-alanine synthase, and L-cysteine hydrogen-sulfide-lyase (adding HCN). This enzyme participates in cyanoamino acid metabolism.
