= SLC67A1 =

Protein-coding gene in humans

Identifiers
- Aliases: SLC67A1, BWR1A, BWSCR1A, HET, IMPT1, ITM, ORCTL2, SLC22A1L, TSSC5, p45-BWR1A, solute carrier family 22 member 18
- External IDs: OMIM: 602631; MGI: 1336884; GeneCards: SLC67A1

Gene location (Human)
Chr.	Chromosome 11 (human)
Band	11p15.4	Start	2,899,721 bp
Band	11p15.4	End	2,925,246 bp

Gene location (Mouse)
Chr.	Chromosome 7 (mouse)
Band	7 F5|7 88.22 cM	Start	143,027,473 bp
Band	7 F5|7 88.22 cM	End	143,053,071 bp
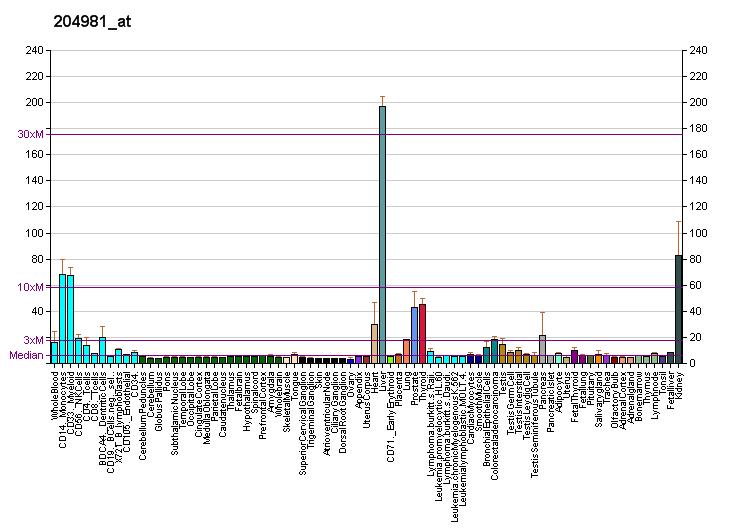
RNA expression pattern
Bgee	Human / Mouse (ortholog); Top expressed in: mucosa of transverse colon; duodenum; right lobe of liver; human kidney; right auricle of heart; blood; left testis; right testis; stromal cell of endometrium; granulocyte / Top expressed in: right kidney; human kidney; lumbar spinal ganglion; left lobe of liver; proximal tubule; duodenum; gastric mucosa; mucous cell of stomach; epithelium of stomach; pyloric antrum; More reference expression data
BioGPS	More reference expression data
Gene ontology
Molecular function	symporter activity; xenobiotic transmembrane transporter activity; ubiquitin protein ligase binding; transporter activity; transmembrane transporter activity
Cellular component	cytoplasm; integral component of membrane; plasma membrane; nuclear envelope; membrane; apical plasma membrane
Biological process	organic cation transport; excretion; ion transport; transmembrane transport; xenobiotic transmembrane transport; xenobiotic export; transport; xenobiotic transport; xenobiotic detoxification by transmembrane export across the plasma membrane
Sources:Amigo / QuickGO
Orthologs
Databases	NCBI: entry; OMA: entry
Species	Human	Mouse
Entrez	5002	18400
Ensembl	ENSG00000276130; ENSG00000110628	ENSMUSG00000000154
UniProt	Q96BI1	Q78KK3
RefSeq (mRNA)	NM_002555; NM_183233; NM_001315501; NM_001315502	NM_001042760; NM_008767
RefSeq (protein)	NP_001302430; NP_001302431; NP_002546; NP_899056	NP_001036225; NP_032793
Location (UCSC)	Chr 11: 2.9 – 2.93 Mb	Chr 7: 143.03 – 143.05 Mb
PubMed search
- Wikidata
View/Edit Human	View/Edit Mouse

Solute carrier family 67 member A1 is a protein that in humans is encoded by the SLC67A1 gene. It was originally denoted SLC22A18, but further research suggested that it was not closely related to other SLC22 members.

== Function ==
This gene is one of several tumor-suppressing subtransferable fragments located in the imprinted gene domain of 11p15.5, an important tumor-suppressor gene region. Alterations in this region have been associated with the Beckwith-Wiedemann syndrome, Wilms tumor, rhabdomyosarcoma, adrenocortical carcinoma, and lung, ovarian, and breast cancer. This gene may play a role in malignancies and disease that involve this region as well as the transport of chloroquine- and quinidine-related compounds in the kidney. Two alternative transcripts encoding the same isoform have been described.

== See also ==
- Solute carrier family
