= Fluoroacetaldehyde =

Names
- Preferred IUPAC name Fluoroacetaldehyde

Identifiers
CAS Number	1544-46-3
3D model (JSmol)	Interactive image
ChEBI	CHEBI:14272
ChemSpider	66406
KEGG	C15488
PubChem CID	73766
UNII	MF7QXP9SQB
CompTox Dashboard (EPA)	DTXSID80165621
- InChI: InChI=1S/C2H3FO/c3-1-2-4/h2H,1H2 Key: YYDWYJJLVYDJLV-UHFFFAOYSA-N
- SMILES: C(C=O)F

Properties
Chemical formula	C_{2}H_{3}FO
Molar mass	62.043 g·mol^{−1}
- Except where otherwise noted, data are given for materials in their standard state (at 25 °C [77 °F], 100 kPa). Infobox references

Fluoroacetaldehyde is a metabolic precursor of both fluoroacetate and 4-fluorothreonine in Streptomyces cattleya.
