= SLC22A14 =

Mammalian protein found in Homo sapiens

Identifiers
- Aliases: SLC22A14, OCTL2, OCTL4, ORCTL4, solute carrier family 22 member 14
- External IDs: OMIM: 604048; MGI: 2685974; GeneCards: SLC22A14

Gene location (Human)
Chr.	Chromosome 3 (human)
Band	3p22.2	Start	38,282,294 bp
Band	3p22.2	End	38,318,575 bp

Gene location (Mouse)
Chr.	Chromosome 9 (mouse)
Band	9|9 F3	Start	118,998,523 bp
Band	9|9 F3	End	119,194,619 bp
RNA expression pattern
Bgee	Human / Mouse (ortholog); Top expressed in: testicle; pancreatic ductal cell; lateral nuclear group of thalamus; left testis; right testis; tibialis anterior muscle; pars reticulata; male germ cell; deltoid muscle; sperm / Top expressed in: spermatid; seminiferous tubule; spermatocyte; proximal tubule; yolk sac; white adipose tissue; spleen; islet of Langerhans; human kidney; right kidney; More reference expression data
BioGPS	n/a
Gene ontology
Molecular function	organic cation transmembrane transporter activity; transmembrane transporter activity; inorganic anion exchanger activity; sodium-independent organic anion transmembrane transporter activity
Cellular component	integral component of membrane; integral component of plasma membrane; membrane
Biological process	organic cation transport; transmembrane transport; inorganic anion transport; sodium-independent organic anion transport
Sources:Amigo / QuickGO
Orthologs
Databases	NCBI: entry; OMA: entry
Species	Human	Mouse
Entrez	9389	382113
Ensembl	ENSG00000144671	ENSMUSG00000070280
UniProt	Q9Y267	Q497L9
RefSeq (mRNA)	NM_004803; NM_001320033	NM_001037749
RefSeq (protein)	NP_001306962; NP_004794	NP_001032838
Location (UCSC)	Chr 3: 38.28 – 38.32 Mb	Chr 9: 119 – 119.19 Mb
PubMed search
- Wikidata
View/Edit Human	View/Edit Mouse

Solute carrier family 22 member 14 is a protein that in humans is encoded by the SLC22A14 gene.

== Function ==
This gene encodes a member of the organic-cation transporter family. It is located in a gene cluster with another member of the family, organic cation transporter like 3. The encoded protein is a transmembrane protein which is thought to transport small molecules and since this protein is conserved among several species, it is suggested to have a fundamental role in mammalian systems. Alternative splicing results in multiple transcript variants. [provided by RefSeq, Feb 2016].
