= Solute carrier family 22 member 15 =

Protein found in humans

SLC22A15

Identifiers
- Aliases: SLC22A15, FLIPT1, PRO34686, solute carrier family 22 member 15
- External IDs: OMIM: 608275; MGI: 3607704; GeneCards: SLC22A15

Gene location (Human)
Chr.	Chromosome 1 (human)
Band	1p13.1	Start	115,976,498 bp
Band	1p13.1	End	116,070,054 bp

Gene location (Mouse)
Chr.	Chromosome 3 (mouse)
Band	3|3 F2.2	Start	101,855,776 bp
Band	3|3 F2.2	End	101,924,453 bp
RNA expression pattern
Bgee	Human / Mouse (ortholog); Top expressed in: corpus callosum; monocyte; inferior ganglion of vagus nerve; bone marrow; C1 segment; subthalamic nucleus; Brodmann area 46; trabecular bone; bone marrow cell; right lung / Top expressed in: granulocyte; spermatid; spermatocyte; epithelium of lens; substantia nigra; trigeminal ganglion; urethra; genital tubercle; Paneth cell; lip; More reference expression data
BioGPS	n/a
Gene ontology
Molecular function	transmembrane transporter activity; organic anion transmembrane transporter activity
Cellular component	integral component of membrane; membrane
Biological process	ion transport; transmembrane transport; organic anion transport
Sources:Amigo / QuickGO
Orthologs
Databases	NCBI: entry; OMA: entry
Species	Human	Mouse
Entrez	55356	242126
Ensembl	ENSG00000163393	ENSMUSG00000033147
UniProt	Q8IZD6	Q504N2
RefSeq (mRNA)	NM_018420	NM_001039371
RefSeq (protein)	NP_060890	NP_001034460
Location (UCSC)	Chr 1: 115.98 – 116.07 Mb	Chr 3: 101.86 – 101.92 Mb
PubMed search
- Wikidata
View/Edit Human	View/Edit Mouse

Solute carrier family 22 member 15 is a protein that in humans is encoded by the SLC22A15 gene.

== Function ==
Organic ion transporters, such as SLC22A15, transport various medically and physiologically important compounds, including pharmaceuticals, toxins, hormones, neurotransmitters, and cellular metabolites. These transporters are also referred to as amphiphilic solute facilitators (ASFs).
