= Metaglidasen =

Clinical data
- Other names: MBX‑102

Identifiers
- IUPAC name: 2-(4-chlorophenyl)-2-[3-(trifluoromethyl)phenoxy]acetic acid
- CAS Number: 4687-08-5
- PubChem CID: 9949411
- ChemSpider: 8125022
- UNII: V02QWF9PMI
- ChEMBL: ChEMBL451321
- PDB ligand: MGZ (PDBe, RCSB PDB)

Chemical and physical data
- Formula: C_{15}H_{10}ClF_{3}O_{3}
- Molar mass: 330.69 g·mol^{−1}
- 3D model (JSmol): Interactive image
- SMILES: C1=CC(=CC(=C1)OC(C2=CC=C(C=C2)Cl)C(=O)O)C(F)(F)F
- InChI: InChI=InChI=1S/C15H10ClF3O3/c16-11-6-4-9(5-7-11)13(14(20)21)22-12-3-1-2-10(8-12)15(17,18)19/h1-8,13H,(H,20,21); Key:DDTQLPXXNHLBAB-UHFFFAOYSA-N

Metaglidasen was a fibrate-like drug candidate developed by Metabolex, Inc. that acts as a selective receptor modulator of the peroxisome proliferator-activated receptor gamma (PPARγ), a nuclear receptor involved in regulating genes linked to glucose and lipid metabolism.

In contrast to traditional thiazolidinedione antidiabetic agents, metaglidasen was claimed to lower plasma glucose levels without common side effects such as weight gain and edema.

== Pharmacology ==
It is a racemic mixture of two stereoisomers with distinct activities on PPAR subtypes: both show partial agonist activity on PPARγ, while their effects on PPARα differ, with one enantiomer acting as a partial agonist and the other as an antagonist. Additionally, metaglidasen’s metabolically active form has been studied for its impact on skeletal muscle chloride channels, revealing a potentially more favorable safety profile compared to other fibrates. Even though the drug made it into phase II/III clinical trials, it was never approved as an anti-diabetic agent.
