= Cyanoalanine =

Names
- IUPAC name (2S)-2-Amino-3-cyanopropanoic acid
- Other names 3-Cyano-L-alanine β-Cyanoalanine; 3-Cyanoalanine, β-Cyano-L-alanine

Identifiers
CAS Number	6232-19-5
3D model (JSmol)	Interactive image
ChEBI	CHEBI:132546
ChemSpider	388802
KEGG	C02512
PubChem CID	439742
UNII	B75AJA4DCJ
CompTox Dashboard (EPA)	DTXSID90977873
- InChI: InChI=1S/C4H6N2O2/c5-2-1-3(6)4(7)8/h3H,1,6H2,(H,7,8)/t3-/m0/s1; Key: BXRLWGXPSRYJDZ-VKHMYHEASA-N
- SMILES: C(C#N)C(C(=O)O)N

Properties
Chemical formula	C_{4}H_{6}N_{2}O_{2}
Molar mass	114.104 g·mol^{−1}
Appearance	White solid
Melting point	213–216 °C (415–421 °F; 486–489 K) decomposition
- Except where otherwise noted, data are given for materials in their standard state (at 25 °C [77 °F], 100 kPa). Infobox references

Cyanoalanine is an amino acid with the formula NCCH_{2}CH(NH_{2})CO_{2}H. Like most amino acids, it exists as a tautomer NCCH_{2}CH(NH_{3}^{+})CO_{2}^{−}. It is a rare example of a nitrile-containing amino acid. It is a white, water-soluble solid. It can be found in common vetch (Vicia sativa).

Cyanoalanine arises in nature by the action of cyanide on cysteine catalyzed by L-3-cyanoalanine synthase:

HSCH_{2}CH(NH_{2})CO_{2}H + HCN → NCCH_{2}CH(NH_{2})CO_{2}H + H_{2}S

It is converted to aspartic acid and asparagine enzymatically.

When cyanoalanine is introduced into proteins, it's CN vibration serves as a reporter of the local environment.

== See also ==
- β-Ethynylserine
- Propargylglycine
