= Dexchlorpheniramine =

Chemical compound

Clinical data
- Trade names: Chlor-trimeton, Polaramine
- AHFS/Drugs.com: Monograph
- MedlinePlus: a682543
- Routes of administration: Oral, Intravenous
- ATC code: R06AB02 (WHO)

Legal status
- Legal status: AU: S3 (Pharmacist only)

Pharmacokinetic data
- Elimination half-life: 21 to 27 hours

Identifiers
- IUPAC name: (3S)-3-(4-chlorophenyl)-N,N-dimethyl-3-pyridin-3-ylpropan-1-amine
- CAS Number: 25523-97-1
- PubChem CID: 33036
- IUPHAR/BPS: 1210
- DrugBank: DB13679
- ChemSpider: 30576
- UNII: 3Q9Q0B929N
- KEGG: D07803
- ChEBI: CHEBI:4464
- ChEMBL: ChEMBL1201353
- CompTox Dashboard (EPA): DTXSID50180225
- ECHA InfoCard: 100.042.779

Chemical and physical data
- Formula: C_{16}H_{19}ClN_{2}
- Molar mass: 274.79 g·mol^{−1}
- 3D model (JSmol): Interactive image
- SMILES: Clc1ccc(cc1)[C@@H](c2ncccc2)CCN(C)C
- InChI: InChI=1S/C16H19ClN2/c1-19(2)12-10-15(16-5-3-4-11-18-16)13-6-8-14(17)9-7-13/h3-9,11,15H,10,12H2,1-2H3/t15-/m0/s1; Key:SOYKEARSMXGVTM-HNNXBMFYSA-N

Dexchlorpheniramine (trade name Polaramine) is an antihistamine with anticholinergic properties used to treat allergic conditions such as hay fever or urticaria. It is the pharmacologically active dextrorotatory isomer of chlorpheniramine.

It came into medical use in 1959 and was patented in 1962.

== Pharmacology ==
Dexchlorpheniramine is an antihistamine, or an antagonist of the histamine H_{1} receptor. A study found that dexchlorpheniramine had a K_{i} value of 20 to 30 μM for the muscarinic acetylcholine receptors using rat brain tissue.
