= SLC22A1 =

Protein-coding gene in the species Homo sapiens

Identifiers
- Aliases: SLC22A1, HOCT1, OCT1, oct1_cds, solute carrier family 22 member 1
- External IDs: OMIM: 602607; MGI: 108111; GeneCards: SLC22A1

Gene location (Human)
Chr.	Chromosome 6 (human)
Band	6q25.3	Start	160,121,815 bp
Band	6q25.3	End	160,158,718 bp

Gene location (Mouse)
Chr.	Chromosome 17 (mouse)
Band	17 A1|17 8.63 cM	Start	12,867,756 bp
Band	17 A1|17 8.63 cM	End	12,894,716 bp
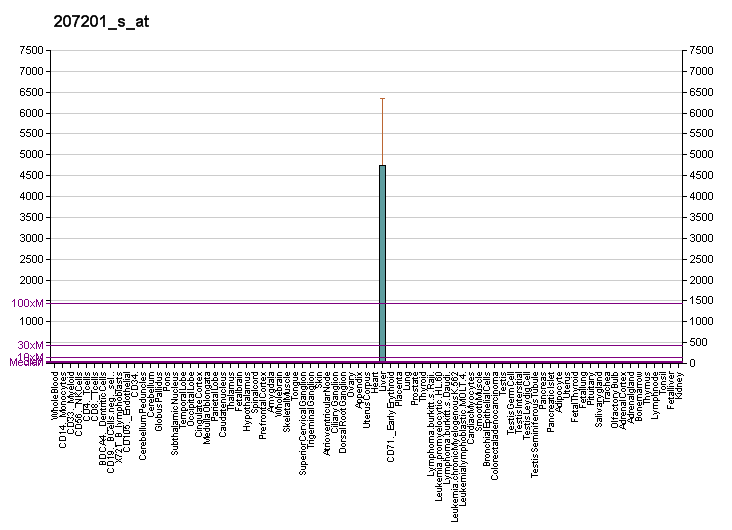
RNA expression pattern
Bgee	Human / Mouse (ortholog); Top expressed in: right lobe of liver; cartilage tissue; testicle; blood; granulocyte; spleen; stromal cell of endometrium; left lobe of thyroid gland; sural nerve; gastrocnemius muscle / Top expressed in: right kidney; left lobe of liver; human kidney; proximal tubule; Ileal epithelium; duodenum; atrioventricular valve; jejunum; Paneth cell; gallbladder; More reference expression data
BioGPS	More reference expression data
Gene ontology
Molecular function	norepinephrine:sodium symporter activity; protein homodimerization activity; transmembrane transporter activity; transporter activity; acetylcholine transmembrane transporter activity; monoamine transmembrane transporter activity; protein binding; identical protein binding; secondary active organic cation transmembrane transporter activity; quaternary ammonium group transmembrane transporter activity; organic cation transmembrane transporter activity; organic anion transmembrane transporter activity; dopamine:sodium symporter activity
Cellular component	integral component of membrane; membrane; plasma membrane; integral component of plasma membrane; basolateral plasma membrane
Biological process	establishment or maintenance of transmembrane electrochemical gradient; xenobiotic transmembrane transport; quaternary ammonium group transport; acetate ester transport; cation transport; ion transport; monoamine transport; norepinephrine transport; epinephrine transport; organic cation transport; dopamine transport; protein homooligomerization; ammonium transmembrane transport; transmembrane transport; neurotransmitter transport; organic anion transport; norepinephrine uptake; dopamine uptake
Sources:Amigo / QuickGO
Orthologs
Databases	NCBI: entry; OMA: entry
Species	Human	Mouse
Entrez	6580	20517
Ensembl	ENSG00000175003	ENSMUSG00000023829
UniProt	O15245	O08966
RefSeq (mRNA)	NM_003057; NM_153187	NM_009202
RefSeq (protein)	NP_003048; NP_694857	NP_033228
Location (UCSC)	Chr 6: 160.12 – 160.16 Mb	Chr 17: 12.87 – 12.89 Mb
PubMed search
- Wikidata
View/Edit Human	View/Edit Mouse

Solute carrier family 22 member 1 is a protein that in humans is encoded by the gene SLC22A1.

== Function ==
Polyspecific organic cation transporters in the liver, kidney, intestine, and other organs are critical for elimination of many endogenous small organic cations as well as a wide array of drugs and environmental toxins. This gene is one of three similar cation transporter genes located in a cluster on chromosome 6. The encoded protein contains twelve putative transmembrane domains and is a plasma integral membrane protein. Two transcript variants encoding two different isoforms have been found for this gene, but only the longer variant encodes a functional transporter.

It is also required for the uptake of metformin by cells.

== See also ==
- Solute carrier family
- Organic cation transport proteins
