= Glutamine—phenylpyruvate transaminase =

Glutamine-phenylpyruvate transaminase

Identifiers
- EC no.: 2.6.1.64
- CAS no.: 68518-06-9

Databases
- IntEnz: IntEnz view
- BRENDA: BRENDA entry
- ExPASy: NiceZyme view
- KEGG: KEGG entry
- MetaCyc: metabolic pathway
- PRIAM: profile
- PDB structures: RCSB PDB PDBe PDBsum
- Gene Ontology: AmiGO / QuickGO
Search
- PMC: articles
- PubMed: articles
- NCBI: proteins

Glutamine-phenylpyruvate transaminase (EC 2.6.1.64) is a pyridoxal phosphate-dependent enzyme that catalyzes the chemical reaction

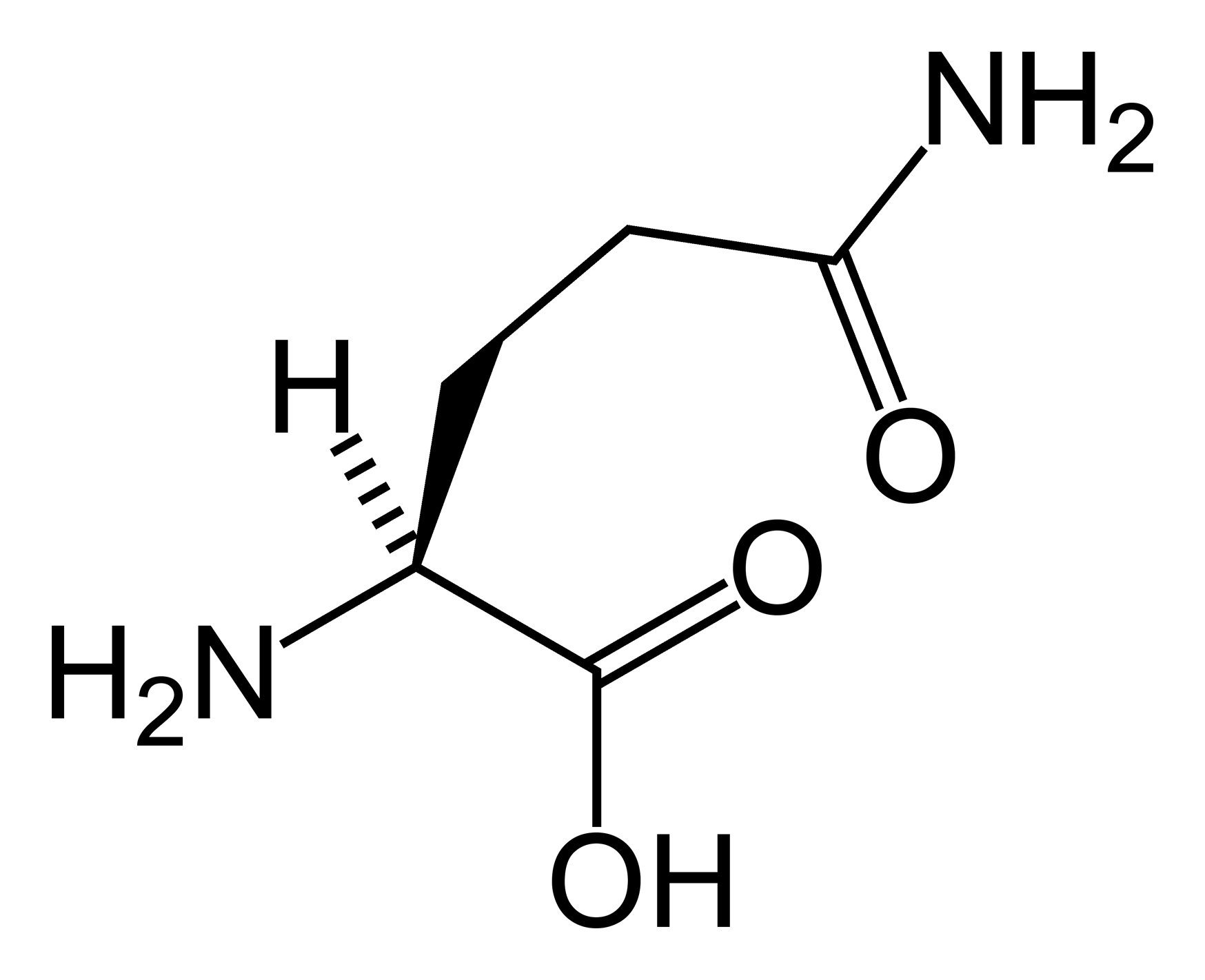
glutamine
+
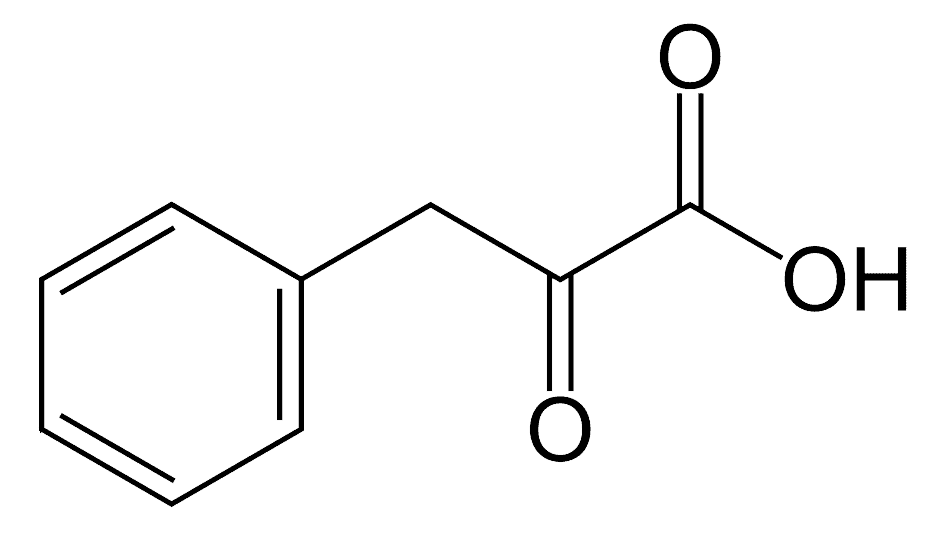
phenylpyruvic acid
2-oxoglutaramic acid
+
phenylalanine

The two substrates of this enzyme characterised from rat kidney are L-glutamine and phenylpyruvic acid. Its products are 2-oxoglutaramic acid and L-phenylalanine.

This enzyme is a transferase, specifically a transaminase, that transfer nitrogenous groups. The systematic name of this enzyme class is L-glutamine:phenylpyruvate aminotransferase. Other names in common use include glutamine transaminase K, and glutamine-phenylpyruvate aminotransferase.

== Structural studies ==
As of late 2007, two structures have been solved for this class of enzymes, with PDB accession codes 1YIY and 1YIZ.
