= SLC22A10 =

Protein-coding gene in the species Homo sapiens

Identifiers
- Aliases: SLC22A10, OAT5, hOAT5, solute carrier family 22 member 10
- External IDs: OMIM: 607580; GeneCards: SLC22A10

Gene location (Human)
Chr.	Chromosome 11 (human)
Band	11q12.3	Start	63,268,022 bp
Band	11q12.3	End	63,311,783 bp
RNA expression pattern
Bgee	Human / Mouse (ortholog); Top expressed in: liver; right lobe of liver; testicle; gonad; superior frontal gyrus; primary visual cortex; Brodmann area 9; right frontal lobe; cingulate gyrus; anterior cingulate cortex / n/a; More reference expression data
BioGPS	n/a
Gene ontology
Molecular function	sodium-independent organic anion transmembrane transporter activity; transmembrane transporter activity; inorganic anion exchanger activity; urate transmembrane transporter activity
Cellular component	integral component of membrane; integral component of plasma membrane; membrane; plasma membrane
Biological process	sodium-independent organic anion transport; transmembrane transport; inorganic anion transport; urate transport; organic anion transport
Sources:Amigo / QuickGO
Orthologs
Databases	NCBI: entry; OMA: entry
Species	Human	Mouse
Entrez	387775	n/a
Ensembl	ENSG00000184999	n/a
UniProt	Q63ZE4	n/a
RefSeq (mRNA)	NM_001039752	n/a
RefSeq (protein)	NP_001034841	n/a
Location (UCSC)	Chr 11: 63.27 – 63.31 Mb	n/a
PubMed search		n/a
- Wikidata
View/Edit Human

Solute carrier family 22 member 10 (SLC22A10), also known as organic anion transporter 5 (OAT5), is a protein that in humans is encoded by the SLC22A10 gene.
