= Β-Ethynylserine =

β-Ethynylserine

Names
- IUPAC name (2S,3R)-2-Amino-3-hydroxypent-4-ynoic acid

Identifiers
CAS Number	65207-64-9
3D model (JSmol)	Interactive image
ChEBI	CHEBI:144833
ChemSpider	113386
KEGG	C22141
PubChem CID	127838
UNII	9LA73F08EF
CompTox Dashboard (EPA)	DTXSID10983496
- InChI: InChI=1S/C5H7NO3/c1-2-3(7)4(6)5(8)9/h1,3-4,7H,6H2,(H,8,9)/t3-,4+/m1/s1 Key: RBWXRFBKVDBXEG-DMTCNVIQSA-N
- SMILES: C#C[C@H]([C@@H](C(=O)O)N)O

Properties
Chemical formula	C_{5}H_{7}NO_{3}
Molar mass	129.115 g·mol^{−1}
- Except where otherwise noted, data are given for materials in their standard state (at 25 °C [77 °F], 100 kPa). Infobox references

β-Ethynylserine (also known as beta-ethynylserine, 3-ethynylserine, or βES) is a non-proteinogenic amino acid containing a terminal alkyne group. It is produced by the bacteria Streptomyces cattleya. It functions as an antimetabolite of L-threonine and in the laboratory it is used as a bioorthogonal analog of threonine for metabolic labeling of proteins.

== Occurrence ==
β-Ethynylserine was first isolated and reported in 1986 as a metabolite produced by the bacterium Streptomyces cattleya. It was identified as an antimetabolite of L-threonine. The biosynthetic gene cluster responsible for its production in S. cattleya was identified and characterized in 2019. In S. cattleya, β-ethynylserine is produced via a dedicated six-gene biosynthetic cluster (bes cluster). The pathway begins with L-lysine, which undergoes radical halogenation by BesD, a radical halogenase, followed by oxidative cleavage and transformations to yield L-propargylglycine. Two additional enzymes (BesA and BesE) then convert L-propargylglycine to β-ethynylserine through β-hydroxylation. This pathway represents a novel mechanism for terminal alkyne formation in amino acids, distinct from fatty acid desaturation routes used for internal alkynes in other natural products.

== Structure and properties ==
β-Ethynylserine is structurally similar to L-threonine, but features a terminal ethynyl group (–C≡CH) instead of a methyl group at the β-carbon. Its molecular formula is C_{5}H_{7}NO_{3}, with a molecular weight of 129.11 g/mol. It exists as the L-isomer in biological contexts.

== Biological activity ==
β-Ethynylserine acts as an antimetabolite of L-threonine, inhibiting the growth of certain bacterial strains.

== Uses ==
In 2023, β-ethynylserine was introduced as the key reagent in the THRONCAT (threonine-derived non-canonical amino acid tagging) method for metabolic labeling of proteins under standard cell culture conditions. It is efficiently incorporated into nascent polypeptide chains in place of threonine during protein synthesis in eukaryotic cells. The terminal alkyne group enables subsequent bioorthogonal conjugation via copper-catalyzed azide-alkyne cycloaddition with fluorescent dyes, affinity tags, or other probes, allowing selective visualization, tracking, or enrichment of newly synthesized proteins.
