= Rhodococcus rhodochrous =

Scientific classification
- Domain: Bacteria
- Kingdom: Bacillati
- Phylum: Actinomycetota
- Class: Actinomycetes
- Order: Mycobacteriales
- Family: Nocardiaceae
- Genus: Rhodococcus
- Species: R. rhodochrous

Binomial name
- Rhodococcus rhodochrous (Zopf 1891) Tsukamura 1974 (Approved Lists 1980)

Species of bacterium

Rhodococcus rhodochrous is a bacterium used as a soil inoculant in agriculture and horticulture.

It is gram positive, in the shape of rods/cocci, oxidase negative, and catalase positive.

It is industrially produced to catalyse acrylonitrile conversion to acrylamide. It is also used in the industrial production of nicotinamide (niacinamide), a derivative or active form of niacin, part of the B vitamin complex.

A 2015 study showed that Rhodococcus rhodochrous could inhibit the growth of Pseudogymnoascus destructans, the fungal species responsible for white nose syndrome in bats.
