= SLC22A13 =

Protein-coding gene in the species Homo sapiens

Identifiers
- Aliases: SLC22A13, OAT10, OCTL1, OCTL3, ORCTL-3, ORCTL3, solute carrier family 22 member 13
- External IDs: OMIM: 604047; MGI: 2143107; GeneCards: SLC22A13

Gene location (Human)
Chr.	Chromosome 3 (human)
Band	3p22.2	Start	38,265,812 bp
Band	3p22.2	End	38,278,757 bp

Gene location (Mouse)
Chr.	Chromosome 9 (mouse)
Band	9|9 F3	Start	119,022,040 bp
Band	9|9 F3	End	119,038,164 bp
RNA expression pattern
Bgee	Human / Mouse (ortholog); Top expressed in: renal cortex; stromal cell of endometrium; metanephros; human kidney; apex of heart; muscle of thigh; blood; mucosa of transverse colon; cerebellum; cerebellar cortex / Top expressed in: right kidney; human kidney; proximal tubule; proximal straight tubule; morula; ganglion of vagus nerve; thyroid gland; embryo; convoluted tubule; blastocyst; More reference expression data
BioGPS	n/a
Gene ontology
Molecular function	transmembrane transporter activity; organic cation transmembrane transporter activity; nicotinate transmembrane transporter activity; inorganic anion exchanger activity; sodium-independent organic anion transmembrane transporter activity
Cellular component	integral component of plasma membrane; apical plasma membrane; membrane; extracellular exosome; integral component of membrane; plasma membrane
Biological process	nicotinate transport; transmembrane transport; urate transport; organic cation transport; NAD biosynthesis via nicotinamide riboside salvage pathway; inorganic anion transport; sodium-independent organic anion transport
Sources:Amigo / QuickGO
Orthologs
Databases	NCBI: entry; OMA: entry
Species	Human	Mouse
Entrez	9390	102570
Ensembl	ENSG00000172940	ENSMUSG00000074028
UniProt	Q9Y226	Q6A4L0
RefSeq (mRNA)	NM_004256	NM_133980
RefSeq (protein)	NP_004247	NP_598741
Location (UCSC)	Chr 3: 38.27 – 38.28 Mb	Chr 9: 119.02 – 119.04 Mb
PubMed search
- Wikidata
View/Edit Human	View/Edit Mouse

Solute carrier family 22 member 13 is a protein that in humans is encoded by the SLC22A13 gene.

== Function ==
This gene encodes a member of the organic-cation transporter family. It is located in a gene cluster with another member of the family, organic cation transporter like 4. The encoded protein is a transmembrane protein involved in the transport of small molecules. This protein can function to mediate urate uptake and is a high affinity nicotinate exchanger in the kidneys and the intestine.
