= Nicotinamide =

Vitamer of Vitamin B3

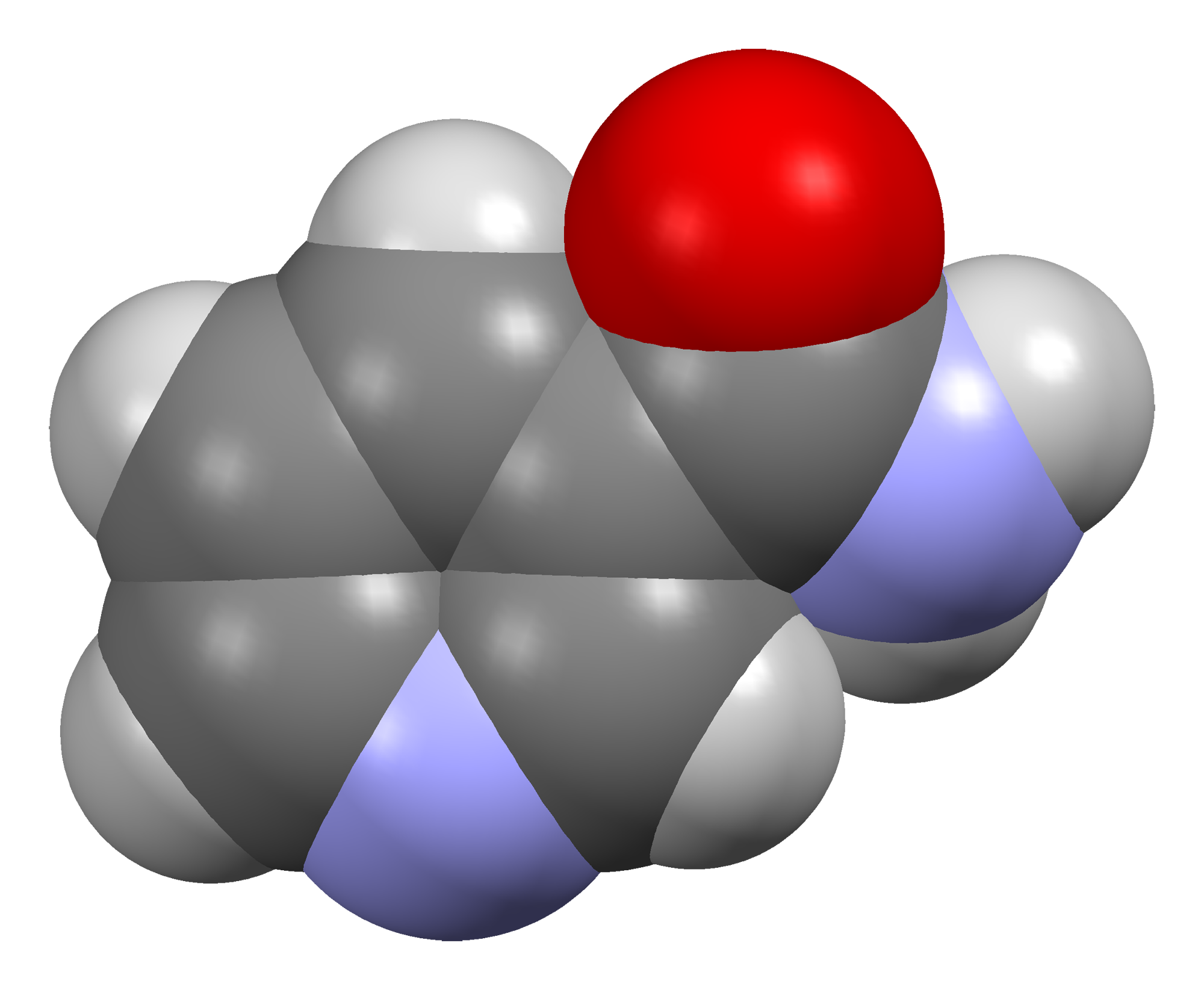

Clinical data
- Pronunciation: /ˌnaɪəˈsɪnəmaɪd/, /ˌnɪkəˈtɪnəmaɪd/
- Other names: NAM, 3-pyridinecarboxamide niacinamide (USAN US) nicotinic acid amide vitamin PP nicotinic amide vitamin B_{3}
- AHFS/Drugs.com: Consumer Drug Information
- License data: US DailyMed: Niacinamide
- Routes of administration: oral, topical
- ATC code: A11HA01 (WHO)

Legal status
- Legal status: US: OTC

Identifiers
- IUPAC name: pyridine-3-carboxamide
- CAS Number: 98-92-0
- PubChem CID: 936
- DrugBank: DB02701
- ChemSpider: 911
- UNII: 25X51I8RD4
- KEGG: D00036
- ChEBI: CHEBI:17154
- ChEMBL: ChEMBL1140
- CompTox Dashboard (EPA): DTXSID2020929
- ECHA InfoCard: 100.002.467

Chemical and physical data
- Formula: C_{6}H_{6}N_{2}O
- Molar mass: 122.127 g·mol^{−1}
- 3D model (JSmol): Interactive image
- Density: 1.40 g/cm^{3} g/cm^{3}
- Melting point: 129.5 °C (265.1 °F)
- Boiling point: 334 °C (633 °F)
- SMILES: c1cc(cnc1)C(=O)N
- InChI: InChI=1S/C6H6N2O/c7-6(9)5-2-1-3-8-4-5/h1-4H,(H2,7,9); Key:DFPAKSUCGFBDDF-UHFFFAOYSA-N

Nicotinamide (INN, BAN UK) or niacinamide (USAN US) (IUPAC name: 3-pyridinecarboxoamide) is a form of vitamin B_{3} found in food and used as a dietary supplement and medication. As a supplement, it is used orally (swallowed by mouth) to prevent and treat pellagra (niacin deficiency). While nicotinic acid (niacin) may be used for this purpose, nicotinamide has the benefit of not causing skin flushing. As a cream, it is used to treat acne, and has been observed in clinical studies to improve the appearance of aging skin by reducing hyperpigmentation and redness. It is a water-soluble vitamin.

Clinical trials have shown promise in protecting eye health, particularly in the context of glaucoma. It is believed to support the health of retinal ganglion cells and may help protect against glaucoma-related damage. Nicotinamide has been studied for its potential neuroprotective effects. While some clinical trials have demonstrated improvements in visual fields and retinal function, it is not yet approved for the treatment of glaucoma. The use of nicotinamide should be approached with caution, especially at high doses, due to the risk of liver injury. Ongoing research continues to explore the full potential of nicotinamide in eye protection and its role in managing eye conditions.

Side effects are minimal. At high doses, liver problems may occur. Normal amounts are safe for use during pregnancy. Nicotinamide is in the vitamin B family of medications, specifically the vitamin B_{3} complex. It is an amide of nicotinic acid. Foods that contain nicotinamide include yeast, meat, milk, and green vegetables.

Nicotinamide was discovered between 1935 and 1937. It is on the World Health Organization's List of Essential Medicines. Nicotinamide is available as a generic medication and over the counter. Commercially, nicotinamide is made from either nicotinic acid (niacin) or nicotinonitrile. In some countries, grains have nicotinamide added to them.

Extraterrestrial nicotinamide has been found in carbonaceous chondrite meteorites.

== Medical uses ==
=== Niacin deficiency ===
Nicotinamide is the preferred treatment for pellagra, caused by niacin deficiency.

=== Acne ===
Nicotinamide cream is used as a treatment for acne. It has anti-inflammatory actions, which may benefit people with inflammatory skin conditions.

Nicotinamide increases the biosynthesis of ceramides in human keratinocytes in vitro and improves the epidermal permeability barrier in vivo. The application of 2% topical nicotinamide for 2 and 4 weeks is effective in lowering the sebum excretion rate. Nicotinamide has been shown to prevent Cutibacterium acnes-induced activation of toll-like receptor 2, resulting in increased down-regulation of pro-inflammatory interleukin-8 production.

=== Skin cancer ===
Nicotinamide at doses of 500 to 1000 mg a day decreases the risk of skin cancers, other than melanoma, in those at high risk.

=== Eye health ===
Nicotinamide has potential benefit in slowing vision loss and providing protection of eye cells, with the most promising evidence for protecting the retina from normal‑tension glaucoma and optic nerve from other forms of glaucoma. Relevant studies in the scientific literature speculate the mechanism of action to be direct retinal ganglion cell protection, among other indirect pathways in the optical nervous system. Contrary to nicotinamide, niacin has not been found to possess any properties in protecting optical nerve components as of 2026.

Current research studies and American Academy of Ophthalmology have suggested a total daily intake of 1000mg, with optimal interval doses of 500mg spread throughout the day in promoting eye health.

== Side effects ==
Nicotinamide has minimal side effects. Acute liver toxicity has been documented in at least one case with doses over 3000mg, with recommended maximum intake in non liver-impaired individuals being 1500mg. Normal doses are safe during pregnancy.

Nicotinamide is contraindicated in individuals diagnosed with liver disease, and/or may cause possible drug interactions.

== Chemistry ==
The structure of nicotinamide consists of a pyridine ring to which a primary amide group is attached in the meta position. It is an amide of nicotinic acid. As an aromatic compound, it undergoes electrophilic substitution reactions and transformations of its two functional groups. Examples of these reactions reported in Organic Syntheses include the preparation of 2-chloronicotinonitrile by a two-step process via the N-oxide,

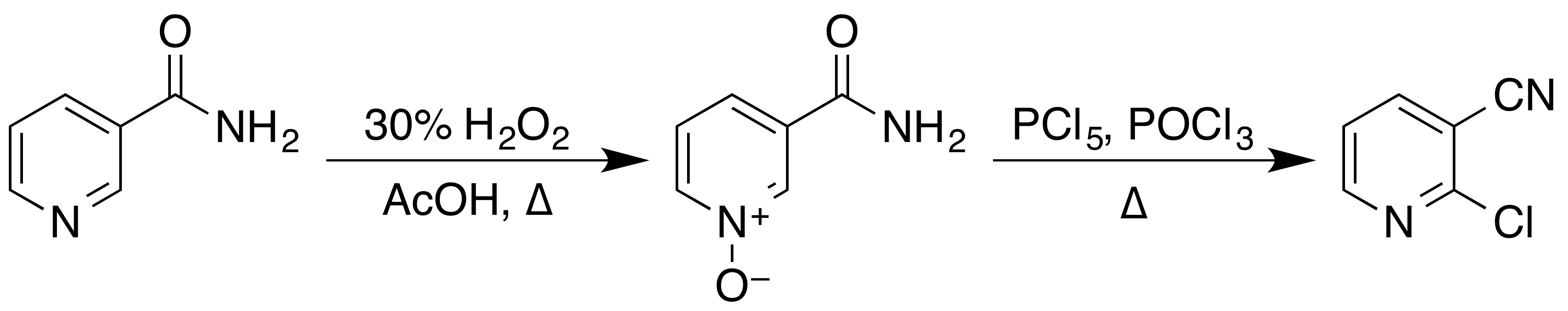

of nicotinonitrile by reaction with phosphorus pentoxide, and of 3-aminopyridine by reaction with a solution of sodium hypobromite, prepared in situ from bromine and sodium hydroxide.

NAD^{+}, the oxidized form of NADH, contains the nicotinamide moiety (highlighted in red)

=== Industrial production ===
The hydrolysis of nicotinonitrile is catalysed by the enzyme nitrile hydratase from Rhodococcus rhodochrous J1, producing 3500 tons per annum of nicotinamide for use in animal feed. The enzyme allows for a more selective synthesis as further hydrolysis of the amide to nicotinic acid is avoided. Nicotinamide can also be made from nicotinic acid. According to Ullmann's Encyclopedia of Industrial Chemistry, worldwide 31,000 tons of nicotinamide were sold in 2014.

=== Biochemistry ===
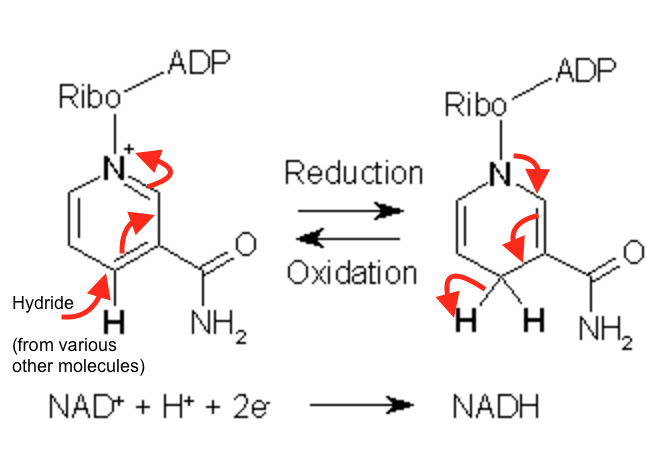
The active nicotinamide group on the molecule NAD^{+} undergoes oxidation in many metabolic pathways.

Nicotinamide, as a part of the cofactor nicotinamide adenine dinucleotide (NADH / NAD^{+}), is crucial to life. In cells, nicotinamide is incorporated into NAD^{+} and nicotinamide adenine dinucleotide phosphate (NADP^{+}). NAD^{+} and NADP^{+} are cofactors in a wide variety of enzymatic oxidation-reduction reactions, most notably glycolysis, the citric acid cycle, and the electron transport chain. If humans ingest nicotinamide, it will likely undergo a series of reactions that transform it into NAD, which can then undergo a transformation to form NADP^{+}. This method of creation of NAD^{+} is called a salvage pathway. However, the human body can produce NAD^{+} from the amino acid tryptophan and niacin without ingestion of nicotinamide.

NAD^{+} acts as an electron carrier that mediates the interconversion of energy between nutrients and the cell's energy currency, adenosine triphosphate (ATP). In oxidation-reduction reactions, the active part of the cofactor is the nicotinamide. In NAD^{+}, the nitrogen in the aromatic nicotinamide ring is covalently bonded to adenine dinucleotide. The shared electrons of the other carbon atoms in the aromatic ring stabilize the formal charge on the nitrogen. When a hydride atom is added onto NAD^{+} to form NADH, the molecule loses its aromaticity and therefore a good amount of stability. This higher-energy product later releases its energy by donating a hydride, and in the case of the electron transport chain, it assists in forming adenosine triphosphate.

When one mole of NADH is oxidized, it releases 158.2 kJ of energy.

=== Biological role ===
Nicotinamide occurs as a component of a variety of biological systems, including within the vitamin B family and specifically the vitamin B_{3} complex. It is also a critically important part of the structures of NADH and NAD^{+}, where the N-substituted aromatic ring in the oxidised NAD^{+} form undergoes reduction with hydride attack to form NADH. The NADPH/NADP^{+} structures have the same ring, and are involved in similar biochemical reactions.

Nicotinamide can be methylated in the liver to biologically inactive 1-methylnicotinamide when there are sufficient methyl donors.

== Food sources ==
Nicotinamide occurs in trace amounts mainly in meat, fish, nuts, and mushrooms, as well as to a lesser extent in some vegetables. It is commonly added to cereals and other foods. Many multivitamins contain 20–30 mg of vitamin B_{3}, and it is also available in higher doses.

== Compendial status ==
- British Pharmacopoeia
- Japanese Pharmacopoeia

== Research ==
A 2015 trial found nicotinamide to reduce the rate of new nonmelanoma skin cancers and actinic keratoses in a group of people at high risk for the conditions.

Nicotinamide has been investigated for many additional disorders, including treatment of bullous pemphigoid and nonmelanoma skin cancers.

Nicotinamide may be beneficial in treating psoriasis.

There is tentative evidence for a potential role of nicotinamide in treating acne, rosacea, autoimmune blistering disorders, ageing skin, and atopic dermatitis. Nicotinamide also inhibits poly(ADP-ribose) polymerases (PARP-1), enzymes involved in the rejoining of DNA strand breaks induced by radiation or chemotherapy. ARCON (accelerated radiotherapy plus carbogen inhalation and nicotinamide) has been studied in cancer.

Research has suggested nicotinamide may play a role in the treatment of HIV.

== Extra-terrestrial occurrence ==
Extra-terrestrial nicotinamide has been found in carbonaceous chondrite meteorites.

Vitamin B3 vitamers from extra-terrestrial sources
Meteorite	Nicotinic acid	Nicotinamide
Orgueil	715 ppb	214 ppb
Murray	626 ppb	65 ppb
Murchison	2.4 nmol/g 190 ppb	16 ppb
Tagish Lake	108 ppb	5 ppb
