= Streptomyces cattleya =

Scientific classification
- Domain: Bacteria
- Kingdom: Bacillati
- Phylum: Actinomycetota
- Class: Actinomycetes
- Order: Streptomycetales
- Family: Streptomycetaceae
- Genus: Streptomyces
- Species: S. cattleya

Binomial name
- Streptomyces cattleya Noble et al. 1978

Species of bacterium

Streptomyces cattleya is a Gram-positive bacterium which makes cephamycin, penicillin and thienamycin. The bacterium expresses a fluorinase enzyme, and the organism has been used to understand the biosynthesis of fluoroacetate and the antibacterial 4-fluoro-L-threonine. The γ-Glu-βes pathway to biosynthesis of non-traditional amino acids β-ethynylserine (βes) and L-propargylglycine (Pra) was first characterized in this species.

The genome, which was sequenced in 2011, contains one chromosome with 6,283,062 base pairs and one megaplasmid with 1,809,491 bp, with an overall guanine-cytosine content of 73%.
