= SLC22A9 =

Protein-coding gene in the species Homo sapiens

Identifiers
- Aliases: SLC22A9, HOAT4, OAT4, OAT7, UST3H, ust3, solute carrier family 22 member 9
- External IDs: OMIM: 607579; MGI: 3042283; GeneCards: SLC22A9

Gene location (Human)
| Chr. | Chromosome 11 (human) |
| Band | 11q12.3 | Start | 63,369,785 bp |
| Band | 11q12.3 | End | 63,410,294 bp |

Gene location (Mouse)
| Chr. | Chromosome 19 (mouse) |
| Band | 19|19 A | Start | 7,841,753 bp |
| Band | 19|19 A | End | 7,943,392 bp |
RNA expression pattern
| Bgee | Human / Mouse (ortholog); Top expressed in: right lobe of liver; Brodmann area 9; right frontal lobe; skin of thigh; anterior cingulate cortex; gallbladder; prefrontal cortex; primary visual cortex; amygdala; islet of Langerhans / Top expressed in: proximal tubule; liver; right kidney; metanephros; human kidney; More reference expression data |
| BioGPS | n/a |
Gene ontology
| Molecular function | sodium-independent organic anion transmembrane transporter activity; short-chain fatty acid transmembrane transporter activity; inorganic anion exchanger activity; urate transmembrane transporter activity |
| Cellular component | integral component of membrane; plasma membrane; basolateral plasma membrane; integral component of plasma membrane; membrane |
| Biological process | sodium-independent organic anion transport; hormone transport; short-chain fatty acid import; transmembrane transport; anion transmembrane transport; inorganic anion transport; urate transport; organic anion transport |
Sources:Amigo / QuickGO
Orthologs
| Databases | NCBI: entry; OMA: entry |
| Species | Human | Mouse |
| Entrez | 114571 | 171405 |
| Ensembl | ENSG00000149742 | ENSMUSG00000067656 |
| UniProt | Q8IVM8 | Q76M72 |
| RefSeq (mRNA) | NM_080866 | NM_134256; NM_001361980 |
| RefSeq (protein) | NP_543142 | NP_599017; NP_001348909 |
| Location (UCSC) | Chr 11: 63.37 – 63.41 Mb | Chr 19: 7.84 – 7.94 Mb |
| PubMed search |
- Wikidata
| View/Edit Human | View/Edit Mouse |

Solute carrier family 22 member 9 is a protein that in humans is encoded by the SLC22A9 gene.

== See also ==
- SLC22A9+protein,+human at the U.S. National Library of Medicine Medical Subject Headings (MeSH)
