= VUF =

VUF can refer to:

- Verifiable unpredictable function, a public-key one-way function in cryptography; see Verifiable random function
- Vänsterns Ungdomsförbund (lit. 'Youth League of the Left'), the name of the Young Left (Sweden) from 1967 to 1970

== See also ==
- Several histamine antagonists:
  - VUF-5681
  - VUF-6002
  - VUF-8430
