= Methimepip =

Names
- IUPAC name 4-(1H-imidazol-4-ylmethyl)-1-methylpiperidine

Identifiers
CAS Number	151070-80-3
3D model (JSmol)	Interactive image
ChEMBL	ChEMBL175782
ChemSpider	9488804
IUPHAR/BPS	1254
MeSH	C500075
PubChem CID	11313837
UNII	259YSH2WL6
CompTox Dashboard (EPA)	DTXSID501027200 DTXSID80462102, DTXSID501027200
- InChI: InChI=1S/C10H17N3/c1-13-4-2-9(3-5-13)6-10-7-11-8-12-10/h7-9H,2-6H2,1H3,(H,11,12) Key: KIAVPENCSGKVQP-UHFFFAOYSA-N; InChI=1/C10H17N3/c1-13-4-2-9(3-5-13)6-10-7-11-8-12-10/h7-9H,2-6H2,1H3,(H,11,12) Key: KIAVPENCSGKVQP-UHFFFAOYAQ
- SMILES: CN1CCC(CC1)CC2=CN=CN2

Properties
Chemical formula	C_{10}H_{17}N_{3}
Molar mass	179.262 g/mol
- Except where otherwise noted, data are given for materials in their standard state (at 25 °C [77 °F], 100 kPa). verify (what is ?) Infobox references

Methimepip is a histamine agonist which is highly selective for the H_{3} subtype. It is the N-methyl derivative of immepip.
