= C6H11N3 =

The molecular formula C_{6}H_{11}N_{3} (molar mass: 125.17 g/mol, exact mass: 125.0953 u) may refer to:

- α-Methylhistamine
- 1-Methylhistamine
- 4-Methylhistamine
