= Histamine trifluoromethyl toluidide =

Names
- IUPAC name 6-[2-(1H-imidazol-5-yl)ethylamino]-N-[4-(trifluoromethyl)phenyl]heptanamide
- Other names HTFMT, HTMT

Identifiers
CAS Number	103827-16-3
3D model (JSmol)	Interactive image
ChemSpider	111155
IUPHAR/BPS	1273
PubChem CID	124846
UNII	Y89R9XVK5W
CompTox Dashboard (EPA)	DTXSID70908620
- InChI: InChI=1S/C19H25F3N4O/c1-14(24-11-10-17-12-23-13-25-17)4-2-3-5-18(27)26-16-8-6-15(7-9-16)19(20,21)22/h6-9,12-14,24H,2-5,10-11H2,1H3,(H,23,25)(H,26,27) Key: PMKJGGBYYNEYPA-UHFFFAOYSA-N; InChI=1/C19H25F3N4O/c1-14(24-11-10-17-12-23-13-25-17)4-2-3-5-18(27)26-16-8-6-15(7-9-16)19(20,21)22/h6-9,12-14,24H,2-5,10-11H2,1H3,(H,23,25)(H,26,27) Key: PMKJGGBYYNEYPA-UHFFFAOYAA
- SMILES: FC(F)(F)c1ccc(cc1)NC(=O)CCCCC(NCCc2cnc[nH]2)C

Properties
Chemical formula	C_{19}H_{25}F_{3}N_{4}O
Molar mass	382.42321
- Except where otherwise noted, data are given for materials in their standard state (at 25 °C [77 °F], 100 kPa). verify (what is ?) Infobox references

Histamine trifluoromethyl toluidide (HTFMT) is a mixed H_{1}/H_{2} histamine agonist which is significantly more potent than histamine itself.

It also produces additional actions which appear to be independent of histamine receptors.
