= OUP (disambiguation) =

OUP is the Oxford University Press, a British publisher.

OUP may also refer to:

- Ohio University Press, an American publisher
- Official Unionist Party, a political party in Northern Ireland

== See also ==
- OUP-16, a histamine agonist drug
