= Immethridine =

Names
- Preferred IUPAC name 4-[(1H-Imidazol-5-yl)methyl]pyridine
- Other names BP-1-5375

Identifiers
CAS Number	87976-03-2
3D model (JSmol)	Interactive image
ChEMBL	ChEMBL82298
ChemSpider	8165087
ECHA InfoCard	100.163.679
IUPHAR/BPS	4024
PubChem CID	9989505
UNII	F8ZT2IBM1X
CompTox Dashboard (EPA)	DTXSID401027207 DTXSID70587878, DTXSID401027207
- InChI: InChI=1S/C9H9N3/c1-3-10-4-2-8(1)5-9-6-11-7-12-9/h1-4,6-7H,5H2,(H,11,12) Key: DFVSGZHJSIEEQQ-UHFFFAOYSA-N; InChI=1/C9H9N3/c1-3-10-4-2-8(1)5-9-6-11-7-12-9/h1-4,6-7H,5H2,(H,11,12) Key: DFVSGZHJSIEEQQ-UHFFFAOYAF
- SMILES: C1=CN=CC=C1CC2=CN=CN2

Properties
Chemical formula	C_{9}H_{9}N_{3}
Molar mass	159.188 g/mol
- Except where otherwise noted, data are given for materials in their standard state (at 25 °C [77 °F], 100 kPa). verify (what is ?) Infobox references

Immethridine (developmental code name BP-1-5375) is a histamine agonist selective for the H_{3} subtype.

== See also ==
- Cipralisant
- GT-2203
