= A-423579 =

- Stereo, Kekulé, skeletal formula of A-423,579 (({[(3R)-3-amino]}))

Names
- Preferred IUPAC name 4′-{3-[(3R)-3-(Dimethylamino)pyrrolidin-1-yl]propoxy}-3′,5′-difluoro[1,1′-biphenyl]-4-carbonitrile

Identifiers
CAS Number	461045-17-0
3D model (JSmol)	Interactive image; Interactive image
ChEMBL	ChEMBL498228
ChemSpider	9524593 (R); 13210784
PubChem CID	11349657 (R); 22994515
UNII	Q2CW3V5WGF
CompTox Dashboard (EPA)	DTXSID90629426
- InChI: InChI=1S/C22H25F2N3O/c1-26(2)19-8-10-27(15-19)9-3-11-28-22-20(23)12-18(13-21(22)24)17-6-4-16(14-25)5-7-17/h4-7,12-13,19H,3,8-11,15H2,1-2H3/t19-/m1/s1 Key: DJXFZKXYKKBTDR-LJQANCHMSA-N
- SMILES: CN(C)C1CCN(CCCOC2=C(F)C=C(C=C2F)C2=CC=C(C=C2)C#N)C1; CN(C)C1CCN(CCCOc2c(F)cc(cc2F):c2ccc(cc2)C#N)C1

Properties
Chemical formula	C_{22}H_{25}F_{2}N_{3}O
Molar mass	385.4502 g/mol
- Except where otherwise noted, data are given for materials in their standard state (at 25 °C [77 °F], 100 kPa). verify (what is ?) Infobox references

A-423,579 is one of a range of histamine antagonists developed by Abbott Laboratories which are selective for the H_{3} subtype, and have stimulant and anorectic effects in animal studies making them potentially useful treatments for obesity. A-423,579 has improved characteristics over earlier drugs in the series with both high efficacy and low toxicity in studies on mice, and is currently in clinical development.
