= PF-03654746 =

Chemical compound

Identifiers
- IUPAC name: trans-N-Ethyl-3-fluoro-3-[3-fluoro-4-(1-pyrrolidinylmethyl)phenyl]cyclobutanecarboxamide
- CAS Number: 935840-31-6
- PubChem CID: 16119086
- ChemSpider: 25069700
- UNII: G3QE979K1X

Chemical and physical data
- Formula: C_{18}H_{24}F_{2}N_{2}O
- Molar mass: 322.400 g·mol^{−1}
- 3D model (JSmol): Interactive image
- SMILES: CCNC(=O)[C@H]1C[C@@](C1)(F)C2=CC(=C(C=C2)CN3CCCC3)F
- InChI: InChI=1S/C18H24F2N2O/c1-2-21-17(23)14-10-18(20,11-14)15-6-5-13(16(19)9-15)12-22-7-3-4-8-22/h5-6,9,14H,2-4,7-8,10-12H2,1H3,(H,21,23)/t14-,18-; Key:SXMBKHYDZOCBMT-PPUGGXLSSA-N

PF-03654746 is a potent and selective histamine H_{3} receptor antagonist developed by Pfizer and currently undergoing clinical trials for the treatment of ADHD, Tourette syndrome as well as potential anti-allergy applications.
