= SCH-79687 =

Names
- Preferred IUPAC name N-(3,5-Dichlorophenyl)-N′-({4-[(1H-imidazol-4-yl)methyl]phenyl}methyl)urea

Identifiers
CAS Number	224585-45-9
3D model (JSmol)	Interactive image
ChEMBL	ChEMBL366977
ChemSpider	7977505
PubChem CID	9801743
UNII	YF792N2EXV
CompTox Dashboard (EPA)	DTXSID20430941
- InChI: InChI=1S/C18H16Cl2N4O/c19-14-6-15(20)8-16(7-14)24-18(25)22-9-13-3-1-12(2-4-13)5-17-10-21-11-23-17/h1-4,6-8,10-11H,5,9H2,(H,21,23)(H2,22,24,25) Key: CXNCQFJNXQAFND-UHFFFAOYSA-N; InChI=1/C18H16Cl2N4O/c19-14-6-15(20)8-16(7-14)24-18(25)22-9-13-3-1-12(2-4-13)5-17-10-21-11-23-17/h1-4,6-8,10-11H,5,9H2,(H,21,23)(H2,22,24,25) Key: CXNCQFJNXQAFND-UHFFFAOYAC
- SMILES: Clc1cc(cc(Cl)c1)NC(=O)NCc2ccc(cc2)Cc3c[nH]cn3

Properties
Chemical formula	C_{18}H_{16}Cl_{2}N_{4}O
Molar mass	375.251 g/mol
- Except where otherwise noted, data are given for materials in their standard state (at 25 °C [77 °F], 100 kPa). verify (what is ?) Infobox references

SCH-79687 is a histamine antagonist selective for the H_{3} subtype.
