= C8H15N3 =

The molecular formula C_{8}H_{15}N_{3} (molar mass: 153.225 g/mol) may refer to:

- Impentamine
- 7-Methyl-1,5,7-triazabicyclo[4.4.0]dec-5-ene
