= BP 2.94 =

Clinical data
- Other names: BP-294; BP 2-94; BP2-94; BP294; FUB-94; FUB94
- Routes of administration: Oral
- Drug class: Histamine H_{3} receptor agonist
- ATC code: None

Identifiers
- IUPAC name: 2-[N-[(2R)-1-(1H-imidazol-5-yl)propan-2-yl]-C-phenylcarbonimidoyl]phenol
- PubChem CID: 135422935
- ChemSpider: 23208952
- ChEMBL: ChEMBL335419

Chemical and physical data
- Formula: C_{19}H_{19}N_{3}O
- Molar mass: 305.381 g·mol^{−1}
- 3D model (JSmol): Interactive image
- SMILES: C[C@H](CC1=CN=CN1)N=C(C2=CC=CC=C2)C3=CC=CC=C3O
- InChI: InChI=1S/C19H19N3O/c1-14(11-16-12-20-13-21-16)22-19(15-7-3-2-4-8-15)17-9-5-6-10-18(17)23/h2-10,12-14,23H,11H2,1H3,(H,20,21)/t14-/m1/s1; Key:SBUFZXRNKJQHLD-CQSZACIVSA-N

BP 2.94, or BP-294, also known as FUB-94, is a histamine H_{3} receptor agonist which was under development for the treatment of asthma, inflammation, pain, and peptic ulcers but was never marketed. It is taken orally.

== Pharmacology ==
The drug functions as an orally active prodrug of (R)-α-methylhistamine, which in turn acts as a potent and selective agonist of the histamine H_{3} receptor. BP 2.94 has shown anti-inflammatory, antinociceptive, gastric anti-secretory, and sedative and hypnotic effects in animals. It has been found to increase slow wave sleep in animals, including dramatically so in cats.

== Development ==
BP 2.94 was under development by Bioprojet. It reached phase 2 clinical trials prior to the discontinuation of its development.

== See also ==
- GT-2203 (VUF-5296)
- SCH-50971
