= Cipralisant =

Chemical compound

Clinical data
- ATC code: none

Identifiers
- IUPAC name: 5-[(1S,2S)-2-(5,5-dimethylhex-1-ynyl)cyclopropyl]-1H-imidazole
- CAS Number: 213027-19-1
- PubChem CID: 10512919
- ChemSpider: 8688320
- UNII: 309713XSKW
- ChEMBL: ChEMBL278462
- CompTox Dashboard (EPA): DTXSID201167209

Chemical and physical data
- Formula: C_{14}H_{20}N_{2}
- Molar mass: 216.328 g·mol^{−1}
- 3D model (JSmol): Interactive image
- SMILES: CC(C)(C)CCC#C[C@H]1C[C@@H]1c2cnc[nH]2
- InChI: InChI=1S/C14H20N2/c1-14(2,3)7-5-4-6-11-8-12(11)13-9-15-10-16-13/h9-12H,5,7-8H2,1-3H3,(H,15,16)/t11-,12-/m0/s1; Key:CVKJAXCQPFOAIN-RYUDHWBXSA-N

Cipralisant (GT-2331, tentative trade name Perceptin) is an extremely potent histamine H_{3} receptor ligand originally developed by Gliatech. Cipralisant was initially classified as a selective H_{3} antagonist, but newer research (2005) suggests also agonist properties, i.e., functional selectivity.

The relatively recent cloning of human H_{3} receptor, as well as the discovery of its constitutive activity provided the ability to better assess the activity of H_{3} receptor ligands. Consequently, cipralisant was reassessed as an H_{3} receptor agonist in human and rat recombinant systems, showing functional selectivity and stimulating one type of G-protein coupled pathway while failing to activate other intracellular pathways.

Gliatech filed for bankruptcy in 2002, and its intellectual property was inherited by Merck. The development of cipralisant seems to have been suspended since 2003 but research is ongoing, and recently it has been shown that it is the (1S,2S)-enantiomer which is the biologically active one.

== See also ==
- List of investigational narcolepsy and hypersomnia drugs
- GT-2203 (VUF-5296)
- SCH-50971
- Immethridine
