= Α-Methylhistamine =

α-Methylhistamine
- Skeletal formula of a minor tautomer of alpha-methylhistamine

Names
- IUPAC name 1-(3H-Imidazol-4-yl)propan-2-amine
- Systematic IUPAC name 1-(1H-Imidazol-4-yl)propan-2-amine

Identifiers
CAS Number	6986-90-9; 75614-87-8 (R); 75614-93-6 (S)
3D model (JSmol)	Interactive image
ChEBI	CHEBI:295965
ChEMBL	ChEMBL116655
ChemSpider	3489
IUPHAR/BPS	1239
MeSH	Alpha-methylhistamine
PubChem CID	3615; 156615 (R); 6603865 (S)
CompTox Dashboard (EPA)	DTXSID80990132
- InChI: InChI=1S/C6H11N3/c1-5(7)2-6-3-8-4-9-6/h3-5H,2,7H2,1H3,(H,8,9) Key: XNQIOISZPFVUFG-UHFFFAOYSA-N; InChI=1/C6H11N3/c1-5(7)2-6-3-8-4-9-6/h3-5H,2,7H2,1H3,(H,8,9) Key: XNQIOISZPFVUFG-UHFFFAOYAW
- SMILES: CC(N)CC1=CNC=N1

Properties
Chemical formula	C_{6}H_{11}N_{3}
Molar mass	125.175 g·mol^{−1}
log P	−0.346
- Except where otherwise noted, data are given for materials in their standard state (at 25 °C [77 °F], 100 kPa). verify (what is ?) Infobox references

α-Methylhistamine is a synthetic derivative and a selective histamine H_{3} receptor agonist. It decreases blood pressure and heart rate in guinea pigs. The drug also has sedative and hypnotic effects in animals.

== See also ==
- BP 2.94
- GT-2203 (VUF-5296; (1R,2R)-cyclopropylhistamine)
- SCH-50971
