= 2-Pyridylethylamine =

- Kekulé, skeletal formula of 2-pyridylethylamine

Names
- Preferred IUPAC name 2-(Pyridin-2-yl)ethan-1-amine

Identifiers
CAS Number	2706-56-1
3D model (JSmol)	Interactive image; Interactive image
Beilstein Reference	111208
ChEBI	CHEBI:147599
ChEMBL	ChEMBL32813
ChemSpider	68424
ECHA InfoCard	100.018.450
EC Number	220-295-1
IUPHAR/BPS	1197
MeSH	2-(2-Aminoethyl)pyridine
PubChem CID	75919
UNII	ATW1AH7OJ5
UN number	2735
CompTox Dashboard (EPA)	DTXSID5022196
- InChI: InChI=1S/C7H10N2/c8-5-4-7-3-1-2-6-9-7/h1-3,6H,4-5,8H2 Key: XPQIPUZPSLAZDV-UHFFFAOYSA-N; InChI=1/C7H10N2/c8-5-4-7-3-1-2-6-9-7/h1-3,6H,4-5,8H2 Key: XPQIPUZPSLAZDV-UHFFFAOYAY
- SMILES: NCCc1ccccn1; NCCC1=CC=CC=N1

Properties
Chemical formula	C_{7}H_{10}N_{2}
Molar mass	122.171 g·mol^{−1}
Density	1.021 g cm^{−3}
Boiling point	93 °C; 199 °F; 366 K at 1.6 kPa
log P	−0.11
Refractive index (n_{D})	1.536

Hazards
- GHS labelling
Pictograms	(GHS07: Exclamation mark)
Signal word	Warning
Hazard statements	H315, H319, H335
Precautionary statements	P261, P305+P351+P338
NFPA 704 (fire diamond)	1 1 0
Flash point	100 °C (212 °F; 373 K)
- Except where otherwise noted, data are given for materials in their standard state (at 25 °C [77 °F], 100 kPa). verify (what is ?) Infobox references

2-Pyridylethylamine is a histamine agonist which is selective for the H_{1} subtype.
