= SCH-50971 =

Clinical data
- Other names: Sch-50971
- Routes of administration: Oral
- Drug class: Histamine H_{3} receptor agonist
- ATC code: None

Identifiers
- IUPAC name: 5-[(3R,4R)-4-methylpyrrolidin-3-yl]-1H-imidazole
- PubChem CID: 9815232
- ChemSpider: 7990982
- ChEMBL: ChEMBL313127

Chemical and physical data
- Formula: C_{8}H_{13}N_{3}
- Molar mass: 151.213 g·mol^{−1}
- 3D model (JSmol): Interactive image
- SMILES: C[C@H]1CNC[C@@H]1C2=CN=CN2
- InChI: InChI=1S/C8H13N3/c1-6-2-9-3-7(6)8-4-10-5-11-8/h4-7,9H,2-3H2,1H3,(H,10,11)/t6-,7-/m0/s1; Key:KTEPQLOOQDLKHF-BQBZGAKWSA-N

SCH-50971 is a histamine H_{3} receptor agonist which was under development for the treatment of anxiety disorders, gastrointestinal disorders, and migraine but was never marketed.

== Pharmacology ==
The drug acts as a potent, selective, and high-affinity agonist of the histamine H_{3} receptor. It has negligible affinity for the histamine H_{1} receptor and other assessed receptors. The drug is also not a histamine H_{2} receptor antagonist. It has greatly improved selectivity compared to the earlier selective histamine H_{3} receptor agonist (R)-α-methylhistamine. The drug is orally active and shows anti-allergy effects, antimigraine effects, sedative and hypnotic effects, and hypolocomotion in animals. In terms of chemical structure, it is a cyclized pyrrolidine derivative of histamine.

== Development ==
SCH-50971 was under development by Schering-Plough. It reached the discovery or preclinical research stage of development. The development of the drug was discontinued by 2001. SCH-50971 was first described in the scientific literature by 1994.

== See also ==
- BP 2.94
- Cipralisant (GT-2331)
- GT-2203 (VUF-5296)
