= Betahistine =

Chemical compound

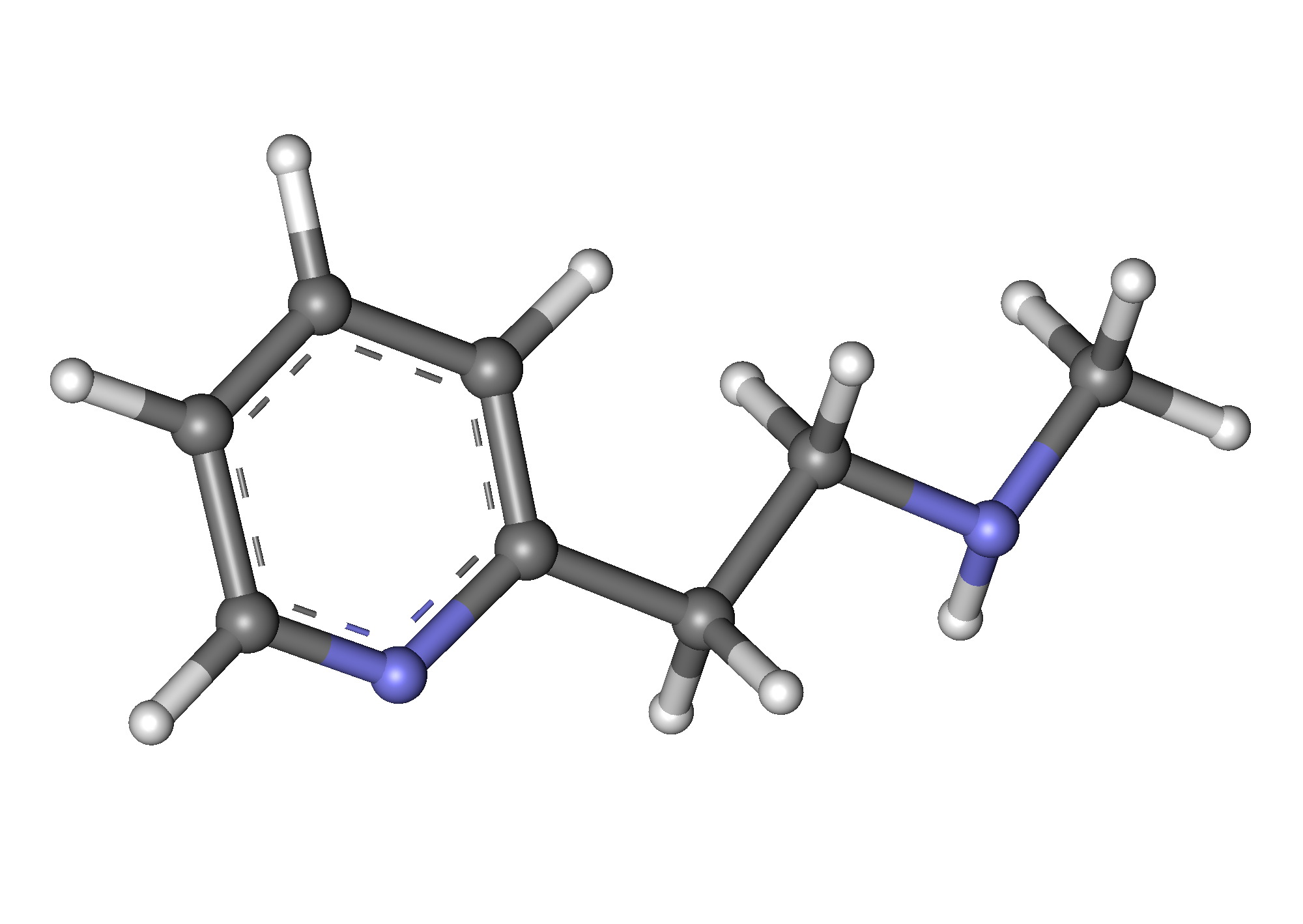

Clinical data
- Trade names: Serc, others
- AHFS/Drugs.com: International Drug Names
- Pregnancy category: C (risk not ruled out)
- Routes of administration: By mouth, intranasal
- ATC code: N07CA01 (WHO)

Legal status
- Legal status: In general: ℞ (Prescription only)

Pharmacokinetic data
- Bioavailability: ~100%
- Protein binding: <5%
- Metabolism: Liver
- Metabolites: • 2-(2-Aminoethyl)pyridine • 2-Pyridylacetic acid
- Onset of action: <1 hour (peak)
- Elimination half-life: 3.5 hours
- Excretion: Urine: 91%

Identifiers
- IUPAC name: methyl[2-(pyridin-2-yl)ethyl]amine
- CAS Number: 5638-76-6
- PubChem CID: 2366
- DrugBank: DB06698
- ChemSpider: 2276
- UNII: X32KK4201D
- KEGG: D07522
- ChEBI: CHEBI:35677
- ChEMBL: ChEMBL24441
- CompTox Dashboard (EPA): DTXSID3022665
- ECHA InfoCard: 100.024.625

Chemical and physical data
- Formula: C_{8}H_{12}N_{2}
- Molar mass: 136.198 g·mol^{−1}
- 3D model (JSmol): Interactive image
- SMILES: n1ccccc1CCNC
- InChI: InChI=1S/C8H12N2/c1-9-7-5-8-4-2-3-6-10-8/h2-4,6,9H,5,7H2,1H3; Key:UUQMNUMQCIQDMZ-UHFFFAOYSA-N

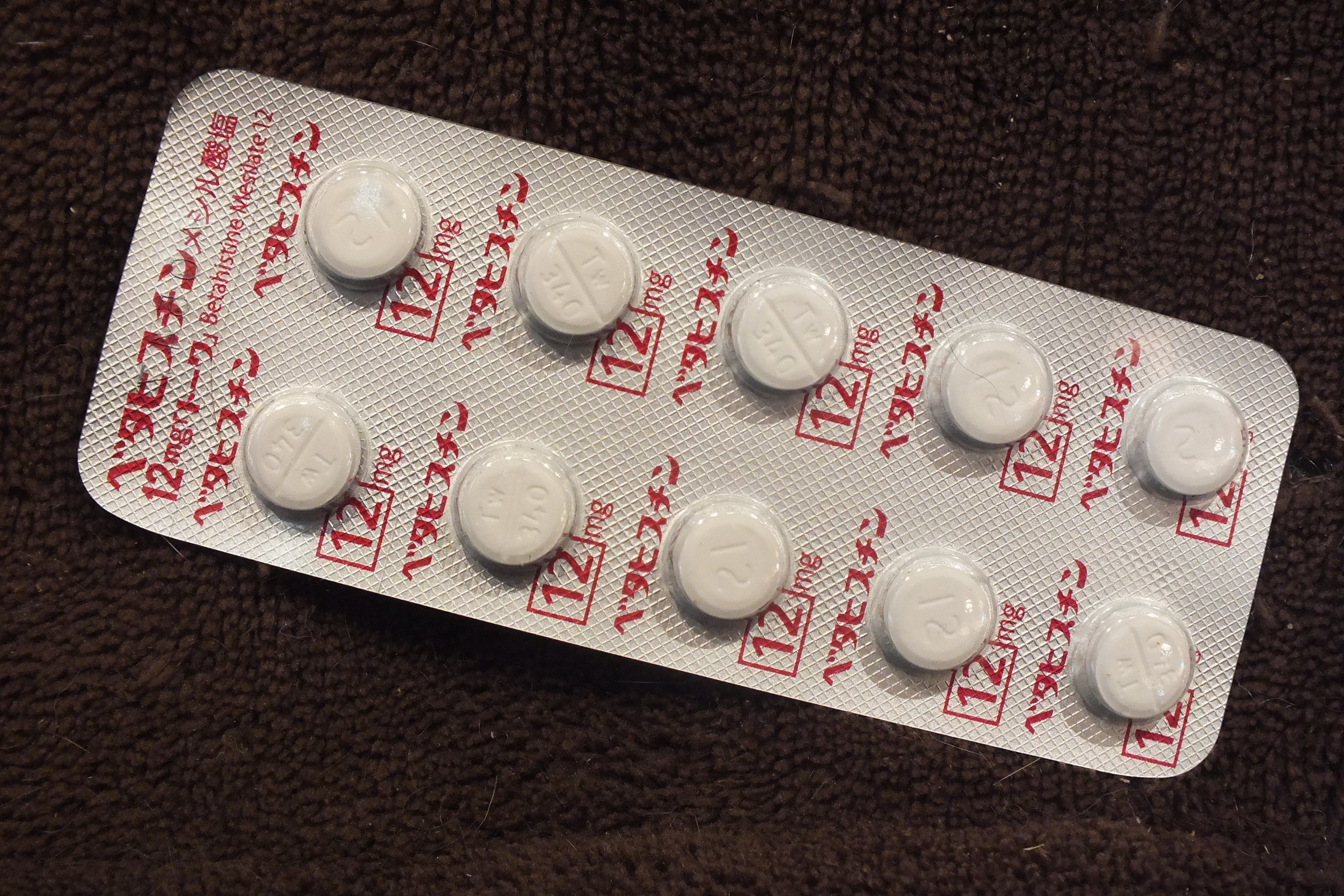
Betahistine(12mg)

Betahistine, sold under the brand name Serc among others, is an anti-vertigo medication. It is commonly prescribed for balance disorders or to alleviate vertigo symptoms. It was first registered in Europe in 1970 for the treatment of Ménière's disease, but current evidence does not support its efficacy in treating it.

== Medical uses ==
Betahistine was once believed to have some positive effects in the treatment of Ménière's disease and vertigo, but more recent evidence casts doubt on its efficacy. Studies of the use of betahistine have shown a reduction in symptoms of vertigo and, to a lesser extent, tinnitus, but conclusive evidence is lacking at present.

Oral betahistine has been approved for the treatment of Ménière's disease and vestibular vertigo in more than 80 countries worldwide, and has been reportedly prescribed for more than 130 million patients. However, betahistine has not been approved for marketing in the United States for the past few decades, and there is disagreement about its efficacy.

The Cochrane Library concluded in 2001 that "Most trials suggested a reduction of vertigo with betahistine and some suggested a reduction in tinnitus but all these effects may have been caused by bias in the methods. One trial with good methods showed no effect of betahistine on tinnitus compared with placebo in 35 patients. None of the trials showed any effect of betahistine on hearing loss. No serious adverse effects were found with betahistine."

An intranasal formulation of betahistine dihydrochloride received orphan drug designation from the US Food and Drug Administration (FDA) for the treatment of obesity associated with Prader–Willi syndrome, a rare genetic disorder.

Betahistine has undergone preliminary clinical research for the treatment of attention deficit hyperactivity disorder (ADHD).

== Contraindications ==
Betahistine is contraindicated for patients with pheochromocytoma. Patients with bronchial asthma or a history of peptic ulcer need to be closely monitored.

== Adverse effects ==
Patients taking betahistine may experience the following adverse effects:

- Headache
- Low level of gastric adverse effects
- Nausea can be an adverse effect, but patients are often already experiencing nausea owing to vertigo, so it goes largely unnoticed.
- Patients taking betahistine may experience hypersensitivity and allergic reactions. In the November 2006 issue of "Drug Safety", Dr. Sabine Jeck-Thole and Dr. Wolfgang Wagner reported that betahistine may cause allergic and skin-related adverse effects. These include rashes in several areas of the body; itching and urticaria (hives); and swelling of the face, tongue, and mouth. Other hypersensitivity reactions reported include tingling, numbness, burning sensations, shortness of breath, and laboured breathing. The study authors suggested that hypersensitivity reactions may be a direct result of betahistine's role in increasing histamine concentrations throughout the body. Hypersensitivity reactions quickly subside after betahistine has been discontinued.

=== Digestive ===
Betahistine may also cause several digestive-related adverse effects. The package insert for Serc, a trade name for betahistine, states that patients may experience several gastrointestinal side effects. These may include nausea, upset stomach, vomiting, diarrhea, dry mouth, and stomach cramping. These symptoms are usually not serious and subside between doses. Patients experiencing chronic digestive problems may lower their dose to the minimum effective and may mitigate the effects by taking betahistine with meals. Additional digestive problems may require that patients consult their physician in order to find a possible suitable alternative.

=== Others ===
People taking betahistine may experience several other adverse effects ranging from mild to serious. The package insert for Serc states that patients may experience nervous-system side effects, including headache. Some nervous system events may also partly be attributable to the underlying condition, rather than the medication used to treat it. Jeck-Thole and Wagner also reported that patients may experience headache and liver problems, including increased liver enzymes and bile-flow disturbances. Any adverse effects that persist or outweigh the relief of symptoms of the original condition may warrant that the patient consult their physician to adjust or change the medication.

== Pharmacology ==
Binding affinities
| Target | Ki | Activity |
|---|---|---|
| H_{1} | ~1 μM | Partial agonist |
| H_{3} | ~2.5 nM | Antagonist |

=== Pharmacodynamics ===
Betahistine is a weak antagonist or inverse agonist at histamine H_{3} receptors and a weak partial agonist at histamine H_{1} receptors.

Betahistine primarily acts on histamine H_{1} receptors located on blood vessels in the inner ear, leading to vasodilation and increased vascular permeability. These effects help to alleviate endolymphatic hydrops, a key factor in Ménière's disease.

Additionally, betahistine interacts with histamine H_{3} receptors as a weak antagonist or inverse agonist. By modulating H_{3} receptors, betahistine increases the release of various neurotransmitters, including histamine, acetylcholine, norepinephrine, serotonin, and GABA from nerve endings. This mechanism contributes to improved blood flow in the inner ear and modulation of vestibular compensation.

Betahistine's effects on neurotransmitter release, particularly serotonin, may also play a role in its modulation of vestibular nuclei activity in the brainstem. These combined actions help alleviate symptoms associated with vestibular disorders.

=== Pharmacokinetics ===
Betahistine comes in both a tablet form and as an oral solution, and is taken orally. It is rapidly and completely absorbed. The mean plasma elimination half-life is 3 to 4 hours, and excretion is virtually complete in the urine within 24 hours. Plasma protein binding is very low. Betahistine is converted to aminoethylpyridine and hydroxyethylpyridine and excreted in the urine as pyridylacetic acid. There is some evidence that one of these metabolites, aminoethylpyridine, may be active and have effects similar to those of betahistine on ampullar receptors.

== Chemistry ==
Betahistine chemically is 2-[2-(methylamino)ethyl]pyridine, and is formulated as the dihydrochloride salt. Its chemical structure closely resembles those of phenethylamine and histamine.

== Society and culture ==
=== Brand names ===
Betahistine is marketed under a number of brand names, including Veserc, Serc, Hiserk, Betaserc, and Vergo.

=== Availability ===
Betahistine is widely used and available in over 115 countries worldwide, including in the United Kingdom.

==== United States ====
Betahistine, marketed as Serc, received initial approval from the US Food and Drug Administration (FDA) in November 1966 for the treatment of Ménière's disease. This approval was based on a single clinical study conducted by Joseph Elia and published in the Journal of the American Medical Association (JAMA) in April of that year. However, concerns soon arose regarding the study's methodology and the strength of its findings, with public criticism appearing in publications such as the Medical Letter on Drugs and Therapeutics. This prompted an FDA investigation, culminating in the agency obtaining Elia's original study data in April 1967. Subsequent review of the data revealed inadequacies, leading the FDA to issue a notice of intent to withdraw approval in 1968.

Instead of immediate withdrawal, the FDA engaged in discussions with Unimed, the manufacturer, regarding the design of a new clinical trial. This decision not to immediately remove betahistine from the market drew congressional scrutiny, particularly from Representative Lawrence Fountain, who cited the Food, Drug, and Cosmetic Act's mandate for withdrawal when substantial evidence of efficacy is lacking. Internal dissent within the FDA regarding the original approval and its reliance on a single study further complicated the situation. The controversy unfolded against the backdrop of the 1962 Kefauver–Harris Amendment, which had strengthened requirements for demonstrating drug efficacy. Ultimately, the FDA terminated betahistine's new drug application on December 21, 1972, following a lawsuit filed by Consumers Union. Unimed's attempted legal challenge to maintain the drug's market presence was also unsuccessful, with the US Court of Appeals for the Second Circuit upholding the FDA's withdrawal. Betahistine remains unapproved by the FDA, although it is available through compounding pharmacies.

== See also ==
- 2-Pyridylethylamine
