= Impromidine =

Chemical compound

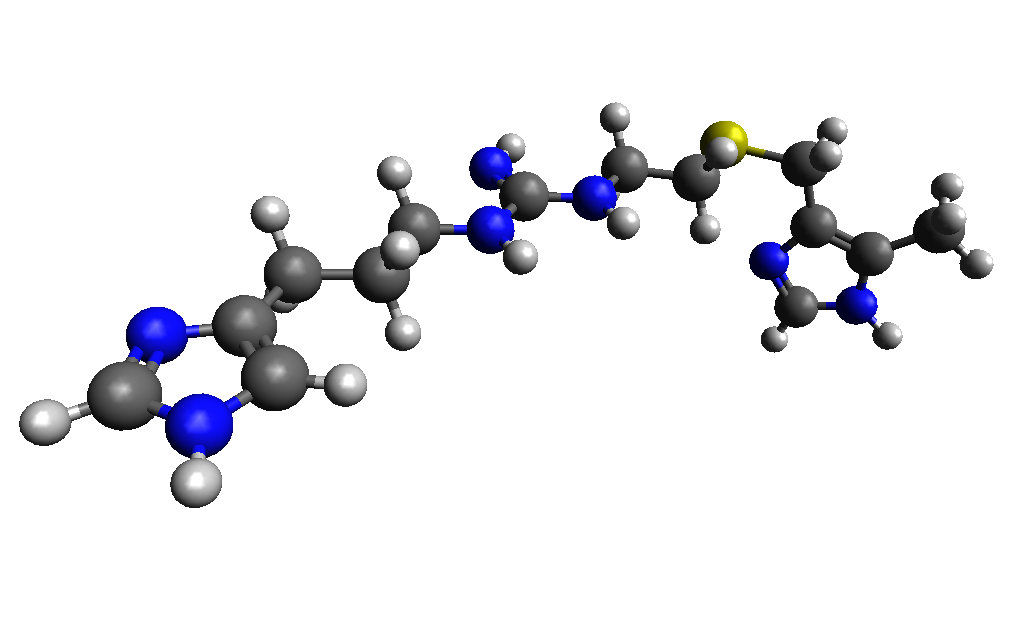

Clinical data
- ATC code: none

Identifiers
- IUPAC name: 2-[3-(1H-imidazol-5-yl)propyl]-1-[2-[(5-methyl-1H-imidazol-4-yl)methylsulfanyl]ethyl]guanidine
- CAS Number: 55273-05-7
- PubChem CID: 41376
- IUPHAR/BPS: 1226
- ChemSpider: 37757
- UNII: 931L4X5WMM
- ChEMBL: ChEMBL12608
- CompTox Dashboard (EPA): DTXSID90203780

Chemical and physical data
- Formula: C_{14}H_{23}N_{7}S
- Molar mass: 321.45 g·mol^{−1}
- 3D model (JSmol): Interactive image
- SMILES: Cc1[nH]cnc1CSCCNC(=N)NCCCc2c[nH]cn2
- InChI: InChI=1S/C14H23N7S/c1-11-13(21-10-19-11)8-22-6-5-18-14(15)17-4-2-3-12-7-16-9-20-12/h7,9-10H,2-6,8H2,1H3,(H,16,20)(H,19,21)(H3,15,17,18); Key:MURRAGMMNAYLNA-UHFFFAOYSA-N

Impromidine (INN) is a highly potent and specific histamine H_{2} receptor agonist.

It has been used diagnostically as a gastric secretion indicator.

== See also ==
- Histamine agonists
