= Histamine H4 receptor =

Mammalian protein found in Homo sapiens

HRH4

Identifiers
- Aliases: HRH4, AXOR35, BG26, GPCR105, GPRv53, H4, H4R, HH4R, histamine receptor H4
- External IDs: OMIM: 606792; MGI: 2429635; GeneCards: HRH4

Gene location (Human)
Chr.	Chromosome 18 (human)
Band	18q11.2	Start	24,460,637 bp
Band	18q11.2	End	24,479,961 bp

Gene location (Mouse)
Chr.	Chromosome 18 (mouse)
Band	18|18 A1	Start	13,140,047 bp
Band	18|18 A1	End	13,155,939 bp
RNA expression pattern
Bgee	Human / Mouse (ortholog); Top expressed in: monocyte; bone marrow; gonad; tibialis anterior muscle; blood; appendix; deltoid muscle; duodenum; right lobe of liver; lymph node / Top expressed in: embryo; spermatocyte; spermatid; vastus lateralis muscle; testicle; thymus; More reference expression data
BioGPS	n/a
Gene ontology
Molecular function	G protein-coupled receptor activity; signal transducer activity; histamine receptor activity; G protein-coupled serotonin receptor activity; G protein-coupled acetylcholine receptor activity; neurotransmitter receptor activity
Cellular component	integral component of membrane; membrane; plasma membrane; integral component of plasma membrane; dendrite
Biological process	positive regulation of cytosolic calcium ion concentration; regulation of MAPK cascade; signal transduction; inflammatory response; negative regulation of adenylate cyclase activity; G protein-coupled receptor signaling pathway; biological process; G protein-coupled receptor signaling pathway, coupled to cyclic nucleotide second messenger; adenylate cyclase-inhibiting G protein-coupled acetylcholine receptor signaling pathway; chemical synaptic transmission; G protein-coupled serotonin receptor signaling pathway
Sources:Amigo / QuickGO
Orthologs
Databases	NCBI: entry; OMA: entry
Species	Human	Mouse
Entrez	59340	225192
Ensembl	ENSG00000134489	ENSMUSG00000037346
UniProt	Q9H3N8	Q91ZY2
RefSeq (mRNA)	NM_001143828; NM_001160166; NM_021624	NM_153087
RefSeq (protein)	NP_001137300; NP_001153638; NP_067637	NP_694727
Location (UCSC)	Chr 18: 24.46 – 24.48 Mb	Chr 18: 13.14 – 13.16 Mb
PubMed search
- Wikidata
View/Edit Human	View/Edit Mouse

The histamine H_{4} receptor, like the other three histamine receptors, is a member of the G protein-coupled receptor superfamily that in humans is encoded by the HRH4 gene.

== Discovery ==
Unlike the histamine receptors discovered earlier, H_{4} was found in 2000 through a search of the human genomic DNA data base.

== Tissue distribution ==
H_{4} is highly expressed in bone marrow and white blood cells and regulates neutrophil release from bone marrow and subsequent infiltration in the zymosan-induced pleurisy mouse model. It was also found that H_{4} receptor exhibits a uniform expression pattern in the human oral epithelium.

== Function ==
The Histamine H_{4} receptor has been shown to be involved in mediating eosinophil shape change and mast cell chemotaxis. This occurs via the βγ subunit acting at phospholipase C to cause actin polymerization and eventually chemotaxis.

The histamine H_{4} receptor has been identified as a vital regulator of the immune system, involved in eosinophil migration, mast cell recruitment, dendritic cell activation, and T cell differentiation. The discovery of this receptor has brought it to increasing attention for its therapeutic use in inflammatory diseases such as allergy, asthma, chronic itch, and autoimmune diseases.

== Structure ==
The 3D structure of the H_{4} receptor has not been solved yet due to the difficulties of GPCR crystallization. Some attempts have been made to develop structural models of the H_{4} receptor for different purposes. The first H_{4} receptor model was built by homology modelling based on the crystal structure of bovine rhodopsin. This model was used for the interpretation of site-directed mutagenesis data, which revealed the crucial importance of Asp94 (3.32) and Glu182 (5.46) residues in ligand binding and receptor activation.

A second rhodopsin based structural model of the H_{4} receptor was successfully used for the identification of novel H_{4} ligands.

Recent advancements in GPCR crystallization, in particular the determination of the human histamine H_{1} receptor in complex with doxepin will likely increase the quality of novel structural H_{4} receptor models.

== Ligands ==
Although the effectiveness of H4 receptor ligands has been studied in animal models and human biological samples, further research is needed to understand genetic polymorphisms and interspecies differences in their actions and pharmacological characteristics.

=== Agonists ===
- 4-Methylhistamine
- VUF-8430 (2-[(Aminoiminomethyl)amino]ethyl carbamimidothioic acid ester)
- OUP-16
- Clozapine
- JNJ 28610244

=== Antagonists ===
- Toreforant (JNJ 38518168)
- Thioperamide (also a selective H3 antagonist)
- JNJ 7777120 (discontinued)
- JNJ 39758979 (discontinued)
- ZPL389
- VUF-6002 (1-[(5-Chloro-1H-benzimidazol-2-yl)carbonyl]-4-methylpiperazine)
- A987306
- A943931
- Pimozide

=== Therapeutic potential ===
The available data support the H4 receptor as a promising new drug target for modulating histamine-mediated immune signaling and offer optimistic prospects for developing new therapies for inflammatory diseases.

H_{4} receptor antagonists could be used to treat asthma and allergies.

The highly selective histamine H_{4} antagonist VUF-6002 is orally active and inhibits the activity of both mast cells and eosinophils in vivo, and has anti-inflammatory and antihyperalgesic effects.

== See also ==
- Histamine H_{1}-receptor
- Histamine H_{2}-receptor
- Histamine H_{3}-receptor
