= Imetit =

Names
- IUPAC name 2-(1H-imidazol-5-yl)ethyl carbamimidothioate

Identifiers
CAS Number	102203-18-9
3D model (JSmol)	Interactive image; Interactive image
ChEMBL	ChEMBL19439
ChemSpider	3564
IUPHAR/BPS	1250
PubChem CID	3692
UNII	677MJ4VPZC
CompTox Dashboard (EPA)	DTXSID8043737
- InChI: InChI=1S/C6H10N4S/c7-6(8)11-2-1-5-3-9-4-10-5/h3-4H,1-2H2,(H3,7,8)(H,9,10) Key: PEHSVUKQDJULKE-UHFFFAOYSA-N; InChI=1/C6H10N4S/c7-6(8)11-2-1-5-3-9-4-10-5/h3-4H,1-2H2,(H3,7,8)(H,9,10) Key: PEHSVUKQDJULKE-UHFFFAOYAJ
- SMILES: C1=C(NC=N1)CCSC(=N)N; S(C(=[N@H])N)CCc1cnc[nH]1

Properties
Chemical formula	C_{6}H_{10}N_{4}S
Molar mass	170.2354 g/mol
- Except where otherwise noted, data are given for materials in their standard state (at 25 °C [77 °F], 100 kPa). verify (what is ?) Infobox references

Imetit is a histamine H_{3} receptor agonist.
