= VUF-8430 =

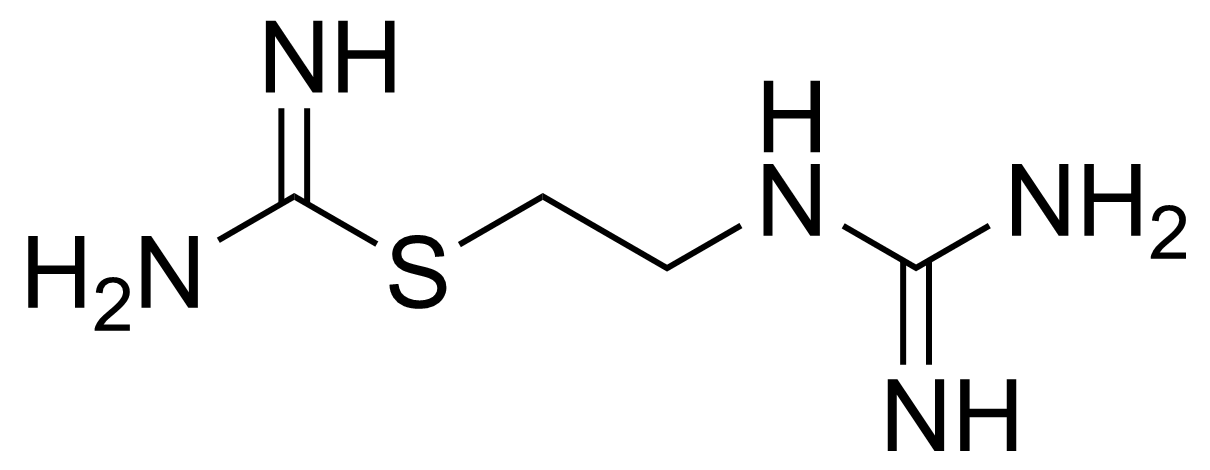
- Skeletal formula of VUF-8430

Names
- Preferred IUPAC name 2-[(Aminoiminomethyl)amino]ethyl carbamimidothioic acid ester

Identifiers
CAS Number	98021-17-1
3D model (JSmol)	Interactive image
Abbreviations	VUF-8430
ChEMBL	ChEMBL1196470
ChemSpider	2323820
IUPHAR/BPS	1274
PubChem CID	3063228
UNII	XL2Z3NH23V
CompTox Dashboard (EPA)	DTXSID801027209
- InChI: InChI=1S/C4H11N5S/c5-3(6)9-1-2-10-4(7)8/h1-2H2,(H3,7,8)(H4,5,6,9) Key: GSYGTVNTZHFQQH-UHFFFAOYSA-N
- SMILES: NC(=N)NCCSC(N)=N

Properties
Chemical formula	C_{4}H_{11}N_{5}S
Molar mass	161.23 g·mol^{−1}
log P	−1.367
- Except where otherwise noted, data are given for materials in their standard state (at 25 °C [77 °F], 100 kPa). verify (what is ?) Infobox references

VUF-8430 is a histamine agonist selective for the H_{4} subtype.
