= OUP-16 =

Names
- IUPAC name 1-cyano-3-[[(2R,5R)-5-(1H-imidazol-5-yl)oxolan-2-yl]methyl]-2-methylguanidine

Identifiers
CAS Number	1038917-11-1
3D model (JSmol)	Interactive image
ChEMBL	ChEMBL321860
ChemSpider	24817698
PubChem CID	10106063
- InChI: InChI=1S/C11H16N6O/c1-13-11(16-6-12)15-4-8-2-3-10(18-8)9-5-14-7-17-9/h5,7-8,10H,2-4H2,1H3,(H,14,17)(H2,13,15,16)/t8-,10-/m1/s1 Key: CCOQWVUQXNRKKP-PSASIEDQSA-N
- SMILES: CN=C(NC[C@H]1CC[C@@H](O1)C2=CN=CN2)NC#N

Properties
Chemical formula	C_{11}H_{16}N_{6}O
Molar mass	248.290 g·mol^{−1}
- Except where otherwise noted, data are given for materials in their standard state (at 25 °C [77 °F], 100 kPa). (what is ?) Infobox references

OUP-16 is a histamine agonist selective for the H_{4} subtype.
