= Proxyfan =

Names
- Preferred IUPAC name 4-[3-(Benzyloxy)propyl]-1H-imidazole

Identifiers
CAS Number	177708-09-7
3D model (JSmol)	Interactive image
ChEBI	CHEBI:93359
ChEMBL	ChEMBL19173
ChemSpider	4927056
IUPHAR/BPS	1255
PubChem CID	6421522
UNII	2F2S8PT5HN
CompTox Dashboard (EPA)	DTXSID00849491
- InChI: InChI=1S/C13H16N2O/c1-2-5-12(6-3-1)10-16-8-4-7-13-9-14-11-15-13/h1-3,5-6,9,11H,4,7-8,10H2,(H,14,15) Key: WNWALBVQAAIULR-UHFFFAOYSA-N
- SMILES: C1=CC=C(C=C1)COCCCC2=CN=CN2

Properties
Chemical formula	C_{13}H_{16}N_{2}O
Molar mass	216.284 g·mol^{−1}
- Except where otherwise noted, data are given for materials in their standard state (at 25 °C [77 °F], 100 kPa). Infobox references

Proxyfan is a histamine H_{3} receptor ligand which is a "protean agonist", producing different effects ranging from full agonist, to antagonist, to inverse agonist in different tissues, depending on the level of constitutive activity of the histamine H_{3} receptor. This gives it a complex activity profile in vivo which has proven useful for scientific research.
