= Iodophenpropit =

Names
- IUPAC name 3-(1H-imidazol-5-yl)propyl N'-[2-(4-iodophenyl)ethyl]imidothiocarbamate
- Other names 1-[3-(3H-imidazol-4-yl)propylthio]-N'-[2-(4-iodophenyl)ethyl]formamidine

Identifiers
| CAS Number | 145196-88-9 |
| 3D model (JSmol) | Interactive image |
| ChEBI | CHEBI:92905 |
| ChEMBL | ChEMBL498770 |
| ChemSpider | 2299913 |
| MeSH | Iodophenpropit |
| PubChem CID | 3035746 |
| UNII | 3SH45L9H3Z |
| CompTox Dashboard (EPA) | DTXSID20273996 |
- InChI: InChI=1S/C15H19IN4S/c16-13-5-3-12(4-6-13)7-8-19-15(17)21-9-1-2-14-10-18-11-20-14/h3-6,10-11H,1-2,7-9H2,(H2,17,19)(H,18,20) Key: UBHYDQAARZKHEZ-UHFFFAOYSA-N
- SMILES: C1=CC(=CC=C1CCN=C(N)SCCCC2=CN=CN2)I

Properties
| Chemical formula | C_{15}H_{19}IN_{4}S |
| Molar mass | 414.30763 g/mol |
- Except where otherwise noted, data are given for materials in their standard state (at 25 °C [77 °F], 100 kPa). verify (what is ?) Infobox references

Iodophenpropit is a histamine antagonist which binds selectively to the H_{3} subtype. Its ^{125}I radiolabelled form has been used for mapping the distribution of H_{3} receptors in animal studies.
