= 4-Methylhistamine =

Names
- Preferred IUPAC name 2-(5-Methyl-1H-imidazol-4-yl)ethan-1-amine

Identifiers
CAS Number	36507-31-0
3D model (JSmol)	Interactive image
ChEMBL	ChEMBL275443
ChemSpider	34368
ECHA InfoCard	100.163.601
IUPHAR/BPS	1269
KEGG	C17929
MeSH	4-methylhistamine
PubChem CID	37463
UNII	54ST71P9EE
CompTox Dashboard (EPA)	DTXSID90957812
- InChI: InChI=1S/C6H11N3/c1-5-6(2-3-7)9-4-8-5/h4H,2-3,7H2,1H3,(H,8,9) Key: UGYXPZQILZRKJJ-UHFFFAOYSA-N; InChI=1/C6H11N3/c1-5-6(2-3-7)9-4-8-5/h4H,2-3,7H2,1H3,(H,8,9) Key: UGYXPZQILZRKJJ-UHFFFAOYAJ
- SMILES: CC1=C(N=CN1)CCN

Properties
Chemical formula	C_{6}H_{11}N_{3}
Molar mass	125.17164 g/mol
- Except where otherwise noted, data are given for materials in their standard state (at 25 °C [77 °F], 100 kPa). verify (what is ?) Infobox references

4-Methylhistamine is a histamine agonist selective for the H_{4} subtype.
