= Toreforant =

Antagonist of the histamine H4 receptor

Names
- IUPAC name 5-(4,6-dimethyl-1H-benzimidazol-2-yl)-4-methyl-N-[3-(1-methylpiperidin-4-yl)propyl]pyrimidin-2-amine

Identifiers
CAS Number	952494-46-1
3D model (JSmol)	Interactive image
ChEMBL	ChEMBL3301609
ChemSpider	31389942
DrugBank	DB12522
KEGG	D10735
PubChem CID	23650961
UNII	U6LA7G393X
CompTox Dashboard (EPA)	DTXSID701336756
- InChI: InChI=1S/C23H32N6/c1-15-12-16(2)21-20(13-15)27-22(28-21)19-14-25-23(26-17(19)3)24-9-5-6-18-7-10-29(4)11-8-18/h12-14,18H,5-11H2,1-4H3,(H,27,28)(H,24,25,26) Key: FCRFVPZAXGJLPW-UHFFFAOYSA-N
- SMILES: CC1=CC(=C2C(=C1)NC(=N2)C3=CN=C(N=C3C)NCCCC4CCN(CC4)C)C

Properties
Chemical formula	C_{23}H_{32}N_{6}
Molar mass	392.551 g·mol^{−1}
- Except where otherwise noted, data are given for materials in their standard state (at 25 °C [77 °F], 100 kPa). Infobox references

Toreforant (JNJ-38518168) is an orally-dosed selective antagonist of the histamine H_{4} receptor that has been studied for various health conditions. It is the successor of a number of H_{4}-selective compounds developed by Johnson & Johnson. Phase IIa clinical trials completed as recently as November 2018 continue to suggest that toreforant is safe.

As of the end of 2020, there is no regulator-approved H_{4} antagonist. In U.S. Phase II clinical trials, toreforant, by itself, did not show efficacy against eosinophilic asthma. The drug did show at least partial efficacy against rheumatoid arthritis in patients who were nonresponsive to methotrexate. As the H_{4} receptor is widely implicated in the regulation of inflammatory states, the potential uses for an H_{4} antagonist remain significant.

== See also ==
- JNJ-7777120
