= Irdabisant =

Clinical data
- Other names: CEP-26401; CEP26401
- Routes of administration: Oral
- Drug class: Histamine H_{3} receptor antagonist; Wakefulness-promoting agent; Nootropic
- ATC code: None

Pharmacokinetic data
- Onset of action: 3–6 hours (T_{max})
- Elimination half-life: 24–60 hours

Identifiers
- IUPAC name: 3-[4-[3-[(2R)-2-methylpyrrolidin-1-yl]propoxy]phenyl]-1H-pyridazin-6-one
- CAS Number: 1005402-19-6
- PubChem CID: 25070031
- DrugBank: DB12900
- ChemSpider: 25991416
- UNII: WH7ISP34KA
- KEGG: D10128
- ChEBI: CHEBI:177564
- ChEMBL: ChEMBL1829335
- CompTox Dashboard (EPA): DTXSID50143375

Chemical and physical data
- Formula: C_{18}H_{23}N_{3}O_{2}
- Molar mass: 313.401 g·mol^{−1}
- 3D model (JSmol): Interactive image
- SMILES: C[C@@H]1CCCN1CCCOC2=CC=C(C=C2)C3=NNC(=O)C=C3
- InChI: InChI=1S/C18H23N3O2/c1-14-4-2-11-21(14)12-3-13-23-16-7-5-15(6-8-16)17-9-10-18(22)20-19-17/h5-10,14H,2-4,11-13H2,1H3,(H,20,22)/t14-/m1/s1; Key:XUKROCVZGZNGSI-CQSZACIVSA-N

Irdabisant (INN, USAN; developmental code name CEP-26401) is a histamine H_{3} receptor antagonist and inverse agonist which was under development for the treatment of cognition disorders but was never marketed. It was specifically under development for the treatment of cognitive problems in people with schizophrenia and Alzheimer's disease. The drug is taken orally.

It shows high affinity for the histamine H_{3} receptor (K_{i} = 2.0 nM) and shows strong selectivity for this receptor over the other histamine receptors and several hundred other targets. The drug produces wakefulness-promoting effects in both rodents and humans. Irdabisant is said to cause "the same energizing and happy feeling as modafinil, but with a more relaxed undertone". In addition however, it dose-dependently disrupts sleep in humans, with side effects including insomnia and headache. The drug can also cause cognitive impairment, perhaps via sleep deprivation, at higher doses. The time to peak levels is 3 to 6 hours and its elimination half-life is 24 to 60 hours.

The chemical synthesis of irdabisant has been described. Analogues of irdabisant have been described.

Irdabisant was under development by Cephalon (since acquired by Teva Pharmaceutical). It reached phase 1 clinical trials prior to the discontinuation of its development.

== See also ==
- Histamine H_{3} receptor antagonist
- Wakefulness-promoting drug
- List of investigational cognition and memory disorder drugs
