= Immepip =

Names
- IUPAC name 4-(1H-imidazol-5-ylmethyl)piperidine

Identifiers
CAS Number	151070-83-6
3D model (JSmol)	Interactive image
ChEMBL	ChEMBL18661
ChemSpider	2299982
IUPHAR/BPS	1251
PubChem CID	3035842
UNII	PZS44KB9KC
CompTox Dashboard (EPA)	DTXSID10164703
- InChI: InChI=1S/C9H15N3/c1-3-10-4-2-8(1)5-9-6-11-7-12-9/h6-8,10H,1-5H2,(H,11,12) Key: MCNGUYXRBCIGOV-UHFFFAOYSA-N; InChI=1/C9H15N3/c1-3-10-4-2-8(1)5-9-6-11-7-12-9/h6-8,10H,1-5H2,(H,11,12) Key: MCNGUYXRBCIGOV-UHFFFAOYAA
- SMILES: C1CNCCC1CC2=CN=CN2

Properties
Chemical formula	C_{9}H_{15}N_{3}
Molar mass	165.2355 g/mol
- Except where otherwise noted, data are given for materials in their standard state (at 25 °C [77 °F], 100 kPa). verify (what is ?) Infobox references

Immepip is a histamine H_{3} receptor agonist. Its a synthetic molecule that is not currently used clinically. As of now, it is used in research. Scientist used Immepip to study CNS histamine signalling and its function.
