= Impentamine =

Names
- IUPAC name 5-(1H-imidazol-5-yl)pentan-1-amine

Identifiers
CAS Number	34973-91-6
3D model (JSmol)	Interactive image
ChEMBL	ChEMBL417096
ChemSpider	7969635
IUPHAR/BPS	1252
MeSH	Impentamine
PubChem CID	9793868
UNII	88JSL4TQ76
CompTox Dashboard (EPA)	DTXSID70430734
- InChI: InChI=1S/C8H15N3/c9-5-3-1-2-4-8-6-10-7-11-8/h6-7H,1-5,9H2,(H,10,11) Key: MZCJWLAXZRFUPI-UHFFFAOYSA-N; InChI=1/C8H15N3/c9-5-3-1-2-4-8-6-10-7-11-8/h6-7H,1-5,9H2,(H,10,11) Key: MZCJWLAXZRFUPI-UHFFFAOYAF
- SMILES: C1=C(NC=N1)CCCCCN

Properties
Chemical formula	C_{8}H_{15}N_{3}
Molar mass	153.2248 g/mol
- Except where otherwise noted, data are given for materials in their standard state (at 25 °C [77 °F], 100 kPa). verify (what is ?) Infobox references

Impentamine is a histamine antagonist selective for the H_{3} subtype.
