= VUF-5681 =

Names
- Preferred IUPAC name 4-[3-(1H-Imidazol-5-yl)propyl]piperidine

Identifiers
CAS Number	768358-61-8
3D model (JSmol)	Interactive image
ChemSpider	8505701
PubChem CID	10330240
UNII	WR5V5TB2TR
CompTox Dashboard (EPA)	DTXSID501277310
- InChI: InChI=1S/C11H19N3/c1(3-11-8-13-9-14-11)2-10-4-6-12-7-5-10/h8-10,12H,1-7H2,(H,13,14) Key: YPGRNKJNOSUCLY-UHFFFAOYSA-N; InChI=1/C11H19N3/c1(3-11-8-13-9-14-11)2-10-4-6-12-7-5-10/h8-10,12H,1-7H2,(H,13,14) Key: YPGRNKJNOSUCLY-UHFFFAOYAZ
- SMILES: C1CNCCC1CCCC2=CN=CN2

Properties
Chemical formula	C_{11}H_{19}N_{3}
Molar mass	193.294 g·mol^{−1}
- Except where otherwise noted, data are given for materials in their standard state (at 25 °C [77 °F], 100 kPa). verify (what is ?) Infobox references

VUF-5681 is a potent and selective histamine antagonist which binds selectively to the H_{3} subtype. However while VUF-5681 blocks the activity of more potent H_{3} agonists, recent studies suggest that it may have some weak partial agonist activity when administered by itself.
