= GT-2203 =

Clinical data
- Other names: VUF-5296; (1R,2R)-Cyclopropylhistamine; (1R,2R)-trans-2-(1H-imidazol-4-yl)cyclopropylamine
- Routes of administration: Unspecified
- Drug class: Histamine H_{3} receptor agonist
- ATC code: None

Identifiers
- IUPAC name: trans-(1R,2R)-2-(1H-imidazol-5-yl)cyclopropan-1-amine
- CAS Number: 186194-74-1
- PubChem CID: 10103168
- ChemSpider: 8278696
- ChEMBL: ChEMBL13559

Chemical and physical data
- Formula: C_{6}H_{9}N_{3}
- Molar mass: 123.159 g·mol^{−1}
- 3D model (JSmol): Interactive image
- SMILES: C1[C@H]([C@@H]1N)C2=CN=CN2
- InChI: InChI=1S/C6H9N3/c7-5-1-4(5)6-2-8-3-9-6/h2-5H,1,7H2,(H,8,9)/t4-,5-/m1/s1; Key:OWWNABDDYQLERE-RFZPGFLSSA-N

GT-2203, also known as VUF-5296, (1R,2R)-cyclopropylhistamine, or (1R,2R)-trans-2-(1H-imidazol-4-yl)cyclopropylamine, is a histamine H_{3} receptor agonist which was under development for the treatment of insomnia and anxiety disorders but was never marketed. Its route of administration was unspecified.

== Pharmacology ==
The drug is a synthetic derivative of the neurotransmitter histamine. The other enantiomer, (1S,2S)-cyclopropylhistamine (VUF-5297), is about 10-fold more potent than GT-2203 as a histamine H_{3} receptor agonist. Both enantiomers are partial agonists of the receptor and both enantiomers show additional weak activity at the histamine H_{1} and H_{2} receptors.

== History ==
GT-2203 was under development by Gliatech. It reached the preclinical research stage of development for insomnia and anxiety disorders prior to the discontinuation of its development in 2004. The drug was first described in the scientific literature by 1997. Aside from immethridine (BP-1-5375), GT-2203 is the only other selective histamine H_{3} receptor agonist to have been developed for potential pharmaceutical use.

== See also ==
- BP 2.94
- Cipralisant (GT-2331)
- Pitolisant
- SCH-50971
