= Histamine H3 receptor =

Mammalian protein found in Homo sapiens

HRH3

Identifiers
- Aliases: HRH3, GPCR97, HH3R, histamine receptor H3
- External IDs: OMIM: 604525; MGI: 2139279; GeneCards: HRH3

Gene location (Human)
Chr.	Chromosome 20 (human)
Band	20q13.33	Start	62,214,960 bp
Band	20q13.33	End	62,220,278 bp

Gene location (Mouse)
Chr.	Chromosome 2 (mouse)
Band	2 H4|2 102.62 cM	Start	179,741,258 bp
Band	2 H4|2 102.62 cM	End	179,746,281 bp
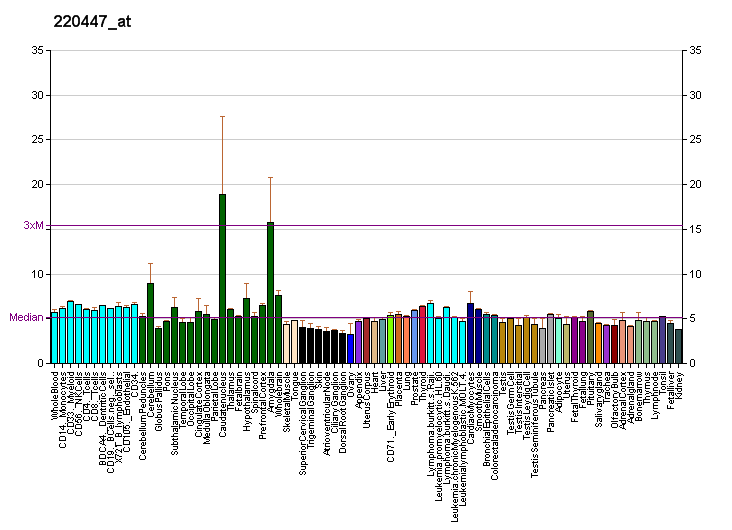

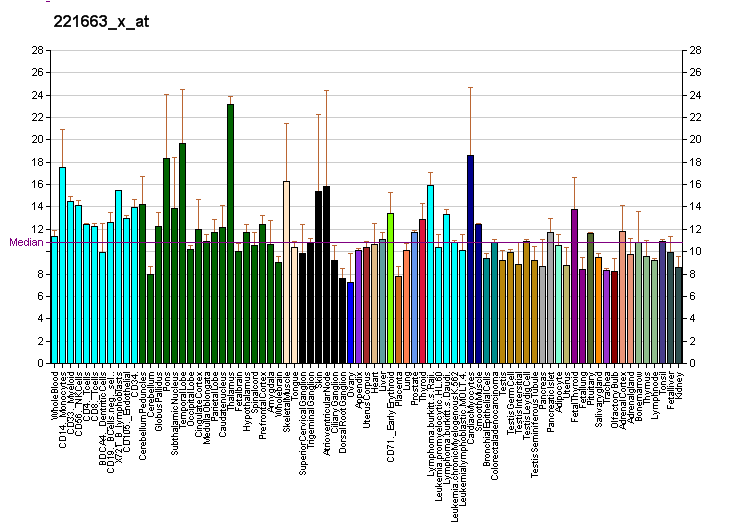
RNA expression pattern
Bgee	Human / Mouse (ortholog); Top expressed in: putamen; nucleus accumbens; right hemisphere of cerebellum; caudate nucleus; anterior cingulate cortex; testicle; right frontal lobe; hypothalamus; Brodmann area 9; prefrontal cortex / Top expressed in: superior frontal gyrus; primary visual cortex; dentate gyrus of hippocampal formation granule cell; lumbar subsegment of spinal cord; medial dorsal nucleus; nucleus of stria terminalis; subiculum; nucleus accumbens; prefrontal cortex; olfactory tubercle; More reference expression data
BioGPS	More reference expression data
Gene ontology
Molecular function	G protein-coupled receptor activity; signal transducer activity; histamine receptor activity; G protein-coupled serotonin receptor activity; G protein-coupled acetylcholine receptor activity; neurotransmitter receptor activity
Cellular component	integral component of membrane; membrane; plasma membrane; integral component of plasma membrane; presynapse; dendrite
Biological process	regulation of norepinephrine secretion; regulation of neurotransmitter levels; negative regulation of glutamate secretion; cognition; G protein-coupled receptor signaling pathway, coupled to cyclic nucleotide second messenger; negative regulation of serotonin secretion; neurotransmitter secretion; signal transduction; negative regulation of adenylate cyclase activity; G protein-coupled receptor signaling pathway; adenylate cyclase-inhibiting G protein-coupled acetylcholine receptor signaling pathway; chemical synaptic transmission; G protein-coupled serotonin receptor signaling pathway
Sources:Amigo / QuickGO
Orthologs
Databases	NCBI: entry; OMA: entry
Species	Human	Mouse
Entrez	11255	99296
Ensembl	ENSG00000101180	ENSMUSG00000039059
UniProt	Q9Y5N1	P58406
RefSeq (mRNA)	NM_007232	NM_133849
RefSeq (protein)	NP_009163	NP_598610
Location (UCSC)	Chr 20: 62.21 – 62.22 Mb	Chr 2: 179.74 – 179.75 Mb
PubMed search
- Wikidata
View/Edit Human	View/Edit Mouse

Histamine H_{3} receptors are expressed in the central nervous system and to a lesser extent the peripheral nervous system, where they act as autoreceptors in presynaptic histaminergic neurons and control histamine turnover by feedback inhibition of histamine synthesis and release. The H_{3} receptor has also been shown to presynaptically inhibit the release of a number of other neurotransmitters (i.e. it acts as an inhibitory heteroreceptor) including, but probably not limited to dopamine, GABA, acetylcholine, noradrenaline, histamine and serotonin.

The gene sequence for H_{3} receptors expresses only about 22% and 20% homology with both H_{1} and H_{2} receptors respectively.

There is much interest in the histamine H_{3} receptor as a potential therapeutic target because of its involvement in the neuronal mechanism behind many cognitive disorders and especially its location in the central nervous system.

== Tissue distribution ==
- Central nervous system
- Peripheral nervous system
- Heart
- Lungs
- Gastrointestinal tract
- Endothelial cells

== Function ==
Like all histamine receptors, the H_{3} receptor is a G-protein coupled receptor. The H_{3} receptor is coupled to the G_{i} G-protein, so it leads to inhibition of the formation of cAMP. Also, the β and γ subunits interact with N-type voltage gated calcium channels, to reduce action potential mediated influx of calcium and hence reduce neurotransmitter release. H_{3} receptors function as presynaptic autoreceptors on histamine-containing neurons.

The diverse expression of H_{3} receptors throughout the brain indicates its ability to modulate the release of a large number of neurotransmitters.

H_{3} receptors are thought to play a part in the control of satiety.

== Isoforms ==
There are at least six H_{3} receptor isoforms in the human, and more than 20 discovered so far. In rats six H_{3}receptor subtypes have been identified so far. Mice also have three reported isoforms. These subtypes all have subtle difference in their pharmacology (and presumably distribution, based on studies in rats) but the exact physiological role of these isoforms is still unclear.

== Pharmacology ==
Histamine

=== Agonists ===
There are currently no therapeutic products acting as selective agonists for H_{3} receptors, although there are several compounds used as research tools which are reasonably selective agonists. Some examples are:

- (R)-α-Methylhistamine
- BP 2.94
- Cipralisant (initially assessed as H_{3} antagonist, later found to be an agonist, shows functional selectivity, activating some G-protein coupled pathways but not others)
- GT-2203 (VUF-5296; (1R,2R)-cyclopropylhistamine)
- Imbutamine (also H4 agonist)
- Immepip
- Imetit
- Immethridine
- Methimepip
- Proxyfan (complex functional selectivity; partial agonist effects on cAMP inhibition and MAPK activity, antagonist on histamine release, and inverse agonist on arachidonic acid release)
- SCH-50971

=== Antagonists ===
H_{3} receptor antagonists include:

- A-304121 (No tolerance formation, silent antagonist)
- A-349,821
- ABT-239
- Betahistine (also weak H_{1} agonist)
- Burimamide (also weak H_{2} antagonist)
- Ciproxifan
- Clobenpropit (also H_{4} antagonist)
- Conessine
- Impentamine
- Iodophenpropit
- Irdabisant
- Pitolisant
- Thioperamide (also H_{4} antagonist)
- VUF-5681 (4-[3-(1H-Imidazol-4-yl)propyl]piperidine)

== Therapeutic potential ==
The H3-receptor is a promising potential therapeutical target for many (cognitive) disorders that are caused by a histaminergic H3R dysfunction, because it is linked to the central nervous system and its regulation of other neurotransmitters. Examples of such disorders are: sleep disorders (including narcolepsy), Tourette syndrome, Parkinson, OCD, ADHD, ASS and drug addictions.

This receptor has been proposed as a target for treating sleep disorders. The receptor has also been proposed as a target for treating neuropathic pain.

Because of its ability to modulate other neurotransmitters, H_{3} receptor ligands are being investigated for the treatment of numerous neurological conditions, including obesity (because of the histamine/orexinergic system interaction), movement disorders (because of H_{3} receptor-modulation of dopamine and GABA in the basal ganglia), schizophrenia and ADHD (again because of dopamine modulation) and research is underway to determine whether H_{3} receptor ligands could be useful in modulating wakefulness (because of effects on noradrenaline, glutamate and histamine).

There is also evidence that the H3-receptor plays an important role in Tourette syndrome. Mouse-models and other research demonstrated that reducing histamine concentration in the H3R causes tics, but adding histamine in the striatum decreases the symptoms. The interaction between histamine (H3-receptor) and dopamine as well as other neurotransmitters is an important underlying mechanism behind the disorder.

== History ==
- 1983: The H_{3} receptor is pharmacologically identified.
- 1988: H_{3} receptor found to mediate inhibition of serotonin release in rat brain cortex.
- 1997: H_{3} receptors shown to modulate ischemic norepinephrine release in animals.
- 1999: H_{3} receptor cloned
- 2000: H_{3} receptors called "new frontier in myocardial ischemia"
- 2002: H_{3}^{(-/-)} mice (mice that do not have this receptor)

== See also ==
- Antihistamine – histamine receptor antagonists
- H_{3}-receptor antagonist
- Histamine H_{1}-receptor
- Histamine H_{2}-receptor
- Histamine H_{4}-receptor
