= Histamine agonist =

Drug to increase activity at histamine receptors

A histamine agonist is a drug which causes increased activity at one or more of the four histamine receptor subtypes.

H_{1} agonists promote wakefulness.

H_{2}: Betazole and Impromidine are examples of agonists used in diagnostics to increase histamine.

H_{3}: Betahistine is a weak Histamine_{1} agonist and a very strong antagonist of the Histamine_{3} autoreceptor. Antagonizing H_{3} increases histaminergic tone.

== See also ==
- Histamine antagonist
