= Discovery and development of beta2 agonists =

Drug discovery

β_{2}-adrenoceptor agonists are a group of drugs that act selectively on β_{2}-receptors in the lungs causing bronchodilation. β_{2}-agonists are used to treat asthma and COPD, diseases that cause obstruction in the airways. Prior to their discovery, the non-selective beta-agonist isoprenaline was used. The aim of the drug development through the years has been to minimise side effects, achieve selectivity and longer duration of action. The mechanism of action is well understood and has facilitated the development. The structure of the binding site and the nature of the binding is also well known, as is the structure activity relationship.

== History ==
The β_{2}-selective agonists were developed in the 20th century and are a very valuable class of drugs. In 1901, Jōkichi Takamine isolated the hormone adrenalin, also known as epinephrine. In 1890, adrenalin was first given to asthma patients orally. It had little or no effect because it is metabolized in the digestive tract and is deactivated. In 1930, epinephrine was for the first time given subcutaneously and was discovered to have a positive effect on asthma. When given subcutaneously adrenalin affects the whole body, giving various side effects and thus reducing the value of this treatment. The inhaled route was later tried and it gave much less adverse effects, but still had inconvenient side effects like fear, anxiety, restlessness, headache, dizziness and palpitation.

In 1940, isoproterenol (isoprenaline) was discovered. This compound had a similar effect as adrenalin but fewer side effects were found. In 1949, isoproterenol was used generally to treat asthma patients, given sublingually or inhaled. The first pressurized metered-dose inhaler was introduced in 1956. This was much more convenient for patients than the previously used squeeze-bulb inhalers. The pressurized metered-dose inhaler technique developed rapidly in the 1970s.

In 1967, it was shown that the β_{2}-receptor was responsible for bronchodilation and this led to development of more selective drugs. In 1961, orciprenaline, a longer acting β_{2}-agonist was found, but it was not as potent as isoproterenol. Orciprenaline does not have the catechol structure which was the reason for the longer action time. In the mid-1960s, albuterol or salbutamol was discovered, followed by tributalin and fenoterol a few years later. Albuterol and terbutaline gave fewer side effects, such as increased heart rate, than isoproterenol. The pharmaceutical company Glaxo discovered salmeterol, a long-acting β_{2}-agonist that had bronchodilation activity for up to 12 hours. It was marketed in 1990. Formoterol, another long-acting β_{2}-agonist, was marketed shortly after. This long duration of action made the treatment for severe asthma and COPD more convenient for the patients because it is inhaled twice a day. In 2013, an extra long-acting β_{2}-agonist, vilanterol, was marketed. Its duration of action lasts for 24 hours which should improve patients' compliance and make the treatment more convenient.

== Clinical use ==
=== Asthma ===
β_{2}-agonists are used to treat asthma, an inflammatory disease in the airways. The inflammation makes the bronchia sensitive to some factors in the environment, which causes bronchoconstriction. When this constriction occurs, the airways get narrow and it causes symptoms like wheezing, chest tightness, shortness of breath, and coughing. The muscles in the airways tighten, and cells in the airway start to produce more mucus than usual, which narrows the airways even more. The symptoms often start in childhood, but it can start at any age .

=== Chronic obstructive pulmonary disease ===
Both short- and long-acting β_{2}-agonists are used to treat chronic obstructive pulmonary disease. COPD causes airflow limitations in the lungs because of inflammation. Smoking is the main risk factor but inhalation of toxic and harmful particles and gases can also cause the disease. The symptoms are abnormal mucus production, inflation in the lungs that causes airflow limitation, abnormal gas exchange and pulmonary hypertension. COPD is most common in people over fifty who have a long history of smoking. The symptoms are at first mild but worsen over time.

=== Use ===
There are two types of β_{2}-agonists, long- and short-acting. They are both inhaled and given by aerosol delivery devices. Long-lasting β_{2}-agonists are often given in a combination with corticosteroids to treat asthma. Short-acting β_{2}-agonists are used to treat exercise-induced asthma, and for asthma patients to get a quick relief of symptoms. They are taken 10–15 minutes before exercise. The bronchodilation begins few minutes after inhalation of short-acting β_{2}-agonists and lasts from 4 to 8 hours. Long-lasting β_{2}-agonists are discouraged in treating acute exercise-induced asthma, because their chronic use might mask poorly controlled asthma.

== Mechanism of action ==
=== Pharmacokinetic ===
The kinetics of airway smooth muscle relaxation, as long as the onset and duration of bronchodilation in asthmatic patients, are reflected by the difference in the mechanism of interaction of short- (SABAs) and long-acting β_{2}-agonists (LABAs) and the β_{2}-receptor. There are many formulations of selective β_{2}-agonists; inhalation is the route of choice because it is the most rapidly effective and is associated with minimum side effects. Sulfate conjugates are the main metabolites; protein binding is rather weak and only insignificant interactions have been found with other drugs. The main enzymes that regulate metabolism of the catecholamines are COMT and MAO. The commercial SABAs, salbutamol and terbutaline are resistant to COMT but are slowly metabolised by MAO, while the LABAs are resistant to both COMT and MAO. Also, the long duration of action for salmeterol is related to increased lipophilicity of the molecules, allowing it to remain for a longer time in the lungs. β_{2}-agonists are mainly eliminated by the renal process after parenteral administration, while after oral administration a more pronounced metabolic clearance (high first pass effect) is responsible for a low bioavailability. The elimination after inhalation has not been studied but the profile is likely somewhere between what we see after parenteral and oral administration.

=== Binding to β adrenergic receptors ===
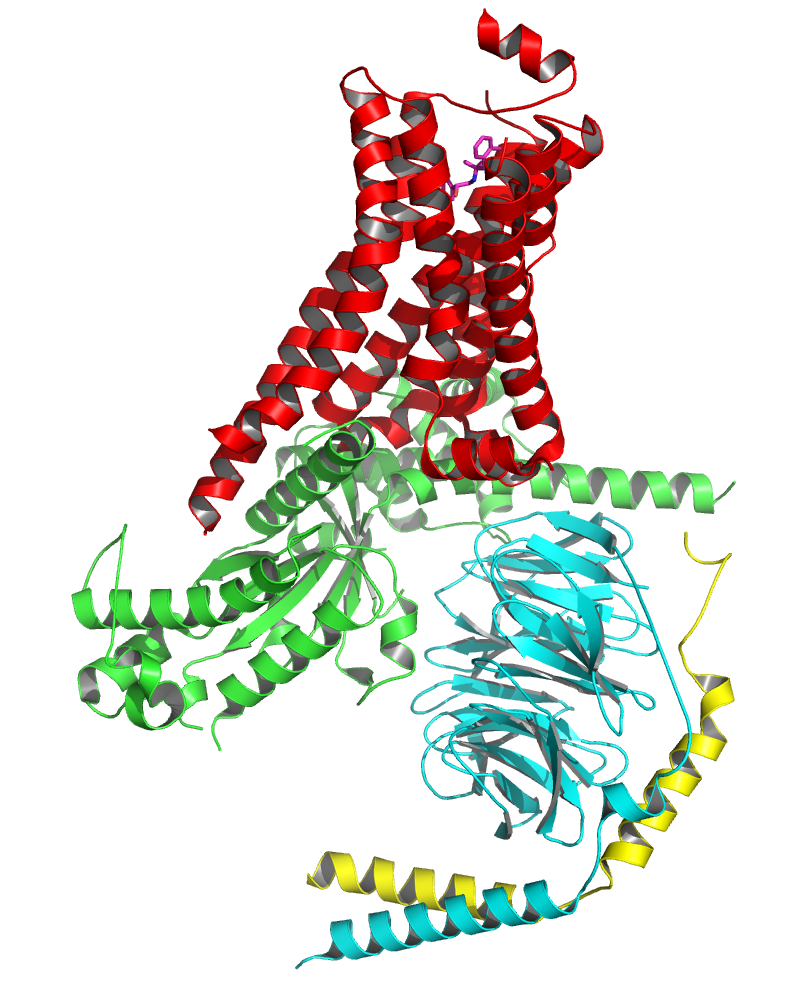
Figure 1: Crystal structure of activated β_{2}-adrenergic receptor in complex with G_{s} (PDB entry 3SN6). The receptor is colored red, Gα green, Gβ cyan, and Gγ yellow. The C-terminus of Gα is located in a cavity created by an outward movement of the cytoplasmic parts of TM5 and 6.

β-receptors are membrane-bound receptors coupled to G-proteins. Three types of β-receptors have been identified by molecular pharmacology. β1 receptors make up to 75% of all beta receptors and are predominantly located in the heart. β2 receptors are found in vascular and bronchial smooth muscle. β3 receptors, which are presumed to be involved in fatty acid metabolism, are located in the adipocytes.

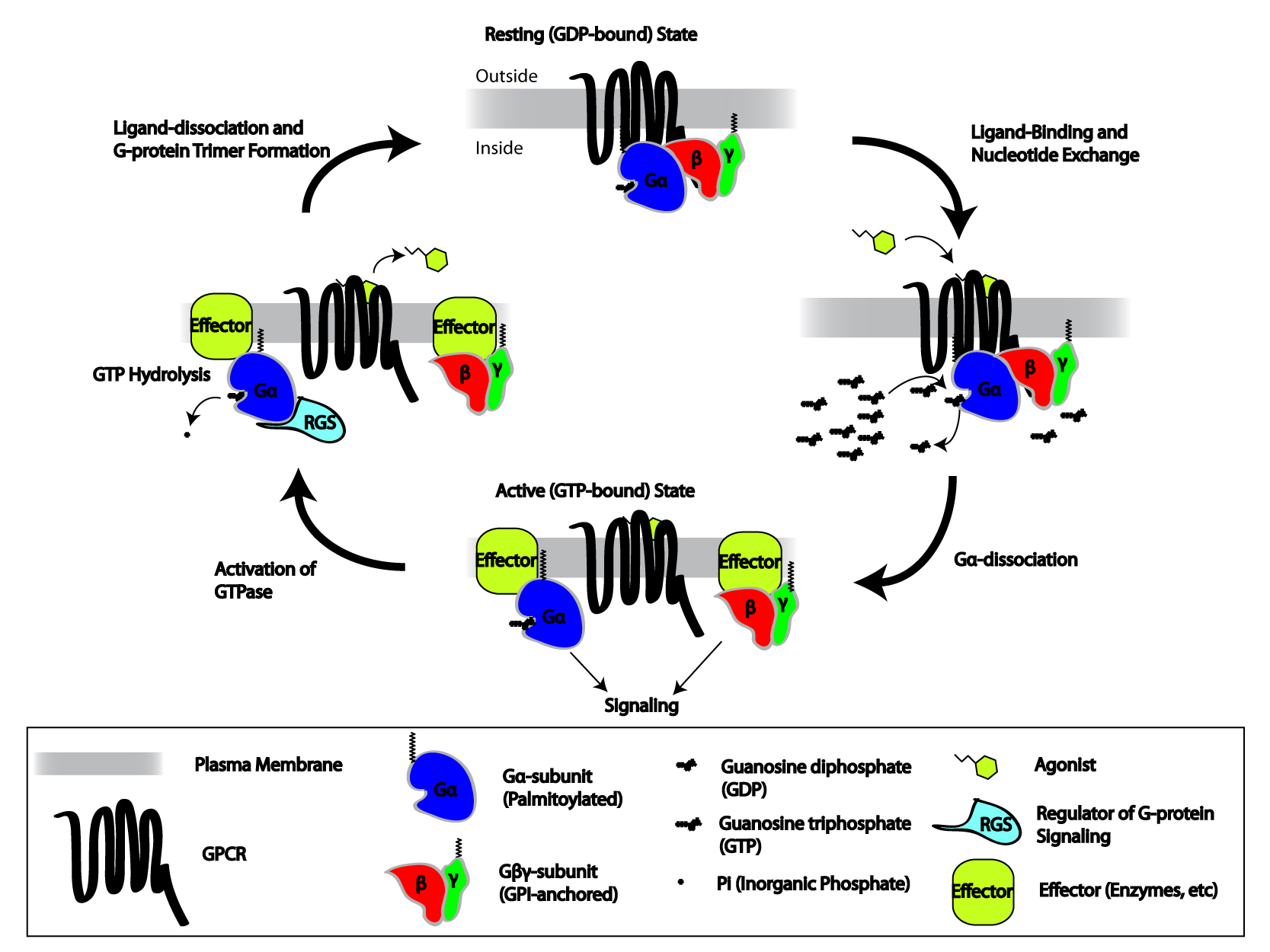
Figure 2: GPCR cycle

G-protein coupled receptors consist of single polypeptide chains of 300-600 amino acids and span the plasma membrane seven times. There are three extracellular loops, one of them being the amino-terminus, and three intracellular loops with a carboxy-terminus. The hydrophilic pocket is formed within the membrane by the seven alpha-helical transmembrane domains. The ligand binds to the hydrophilic pocket in the receptor protein and activates the receptor, giving rise to the cellular effect.

When the β_{2}-agonist binds and activates the β_{2}-adrenoreceptor intracellular signaling becomes largely affected through cyclic adenosine monophosphate (cAMP) and protein kinase A (PKA). The coupling of the β_{2}-receptor to adenylate cyclase is affected through a trimeric Gs protein, as shown in figure 2, consisting of an α-subunit (which stimulates adenylate cyclase) and βγ-subunits (which transduce other signals). Adenylate cyclase catalyzes the conversion of adenosine triphosphate into cAMP, which is a second messenger, thereby increasing the intracellular cAMP levels, resulting in relaxation of smooth muscles. cAMP levels are regulated through the activity of phosphodiesterase isozymes/isoforms, which degrades it to 5′-AMP. The mechanism by which cAMP induces relaxation in airway smooth muscle cells is not fully understood. It is believed that cAMP catalyzes the activation of PKA, which in turn phosphorylates key regulatory proteins involved in the control of muscle tone. cAMP also has a role in inhibition of calcium ion (Ca^{2+}) release from intracellular stores, sequestration of intracellular Ca^{2+}, and reduction of membrane Ca^{2+} entry, leading to relaxation of the airway smooth muscle.

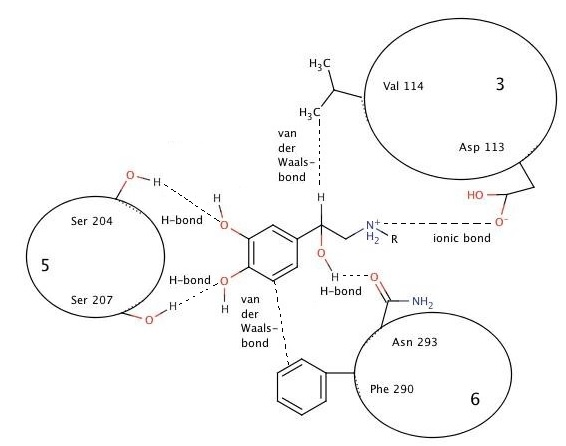
Figure 3: The binding of norephinephrine to the binding site

The binding of norephinephrine to the binding site consists of one ionic bond, three hydrogen bonds and van der Waals interaction in two places. Ionic bonding forms between the protonated amine and Asp-113 in helix 3. Hydrogen bonds are formed from the hydroxyl groups, linked to the catechol ring, to Ser-204 and Ser-207 in helix 5. This binding limits configurational and rotational freedom. Van der Waals forces between aromatic catechol ring and Phe-290 in helix 6 residue and Val-114 in helix 3 residue reinforce the binding. It is believed that the N-alkyl substituents fit into a hydrophobic pocket formed between residues in helix 6 and 7. The beta-carbon is chiral and must have the R-configuration so that the beta-hydroxyl group is oriented towards the Asn-293 residue in helix 6 to form a hydrogen bond essential to binding to the beta-2 receptor.

=== Mechanism of long acting β_{2}-agonists ===
Two theories explain the long time of action for LABAs. The first explained the long action in terms of a putative “exosite” or “exoceptor” distinct from the β_{2}-adrenoreceptor that long aliphatic tail of salmeterol binds to with high affinity. This allows the active saligenin head to angle on and off the receptor to activate it repeatedly. Formoterol does not have a long side chain like salmeterol to bind to the “exosite”, so this theory has been questioned. In 1994 Anderson. et al. introduced the plasmalemma diffusion microkinetic theory, explaining what happens to the β_{2}- agonist in the cell membrane lipid bilayer and in the aqueous biophase closest to the binding site of the β_{2}-adrenoceptor. It is postulated that the plasmalemma lipid bilayer of airway smooth muscles acts as a depot for β_{2}-adrenoceptor agonists. β_{2}-adrenoceptor agonists remain available to interact with the β_{2}-adrenoceptor active site after having partitioned into the lipid bilayer.

== Structure–activity relationships (SAR) ==
=== Basic structure of agonists ===
The fundamental pharmacophore for all adrenergic agonists is a substituted phenethylamine which increases the duration of action.

=== Activity of β_{2}-adrenoceptor agonists ===
Adrenergic agonists that are selective for the β_{2} subtype cause bronchial dilation and might be expected to relieve the bronchospasm of an asthmatic attack. Nonselective β-agonists have stimulatory cardiac effects and therefore have limited use in cardiac patients with asthma.

Administration of higher doses of short-acting β_{2}-agonists increases duration of action but also increases side effects such as cardiac effects. One approach to avoid these side effects is to use structurally different features that may minimize absorption into systemic circulation. For example, one could use drugs that transform into inactive metabolites upon entry into systemic circulation.

Substituents on the pharmacophore influence whether an analog will be direct- or indirect-acting or a mixture of both. It also influences the specificity for the β-receptor subtypes. Direct-acting analog binds the β-adrenergic receptors directly and generates sympathetic response. Indirect-acting analog causes agonistic effect but without a direct binding to the β-adrenergic receptor, for example, by promoting release of norepinephrine (NE) from the presynaptic terminal or by inhibiting reuptake of released NE.

=== Basic structure for every β_{2}-agonists ===
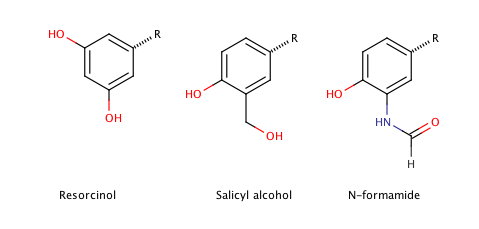
Figure 4: Examples of phenyl rings used for β_{2}-agonists

Figure 4 shows the phenyl rings that are used for β_{2}-agonists. They are named resorcinol ring, a salicyl alcohol or an m-formamide group. Figure 5 shows where different substituents on phenylethylamine take places marked as different R-groups.

==== Activity of R-groups listed ====
Figure 5: Substitution of R-groups on phenylethylamine

The difference between substituents R1-R5 is described below. All marketed β_{2}-agonists have hydroxyl group in position R3 and most often in position R5.

R^{N}: This group determines α- or β-receptor selectivity. The larger the substituent, the greater the selectivity for the β-receptor. If t-butyl is positioned at R^{N} it shows high affinity for the β_{2}-receptor. A long phenylbutoxyhexyl substituent in this position gives high β_{2}-selectivity and also high lipophilicity and therefore a longer duration of action.

R^{α}: Substituents other than hydrogen would give increased duration of action. An ethyl group would increase the selectivity for the β_{2}-receptor. However, an ethyl group seems to cause increased adverse effects and low β_{2}-receptor potency compared to other β_{2}-selective agonists.

R^{β}: A hydroxyl group gives direct action to the β-receptor. As noted earlier, all marketed β_{2}-agonists have a hydroxyl group in this position which makes the compound chiral, and is active when it has the (R)-configuration.

R^{5} or R^{3}: Hydroxyl group placed on carbon number 5 or 3 (meta position) gives direct action to the β-adrenergic receptor.

R^{4}: Either hydroxyl group or hydrogen group in this position gives direct action to the β-receptor.

Summarizing a few β_{2}-adrenoceptor agonists and their structure activity shows how they act differently referred to potency, selectivity, affinity and duration of action (see table 1):

Table 1 Structure of β_{2}-agonists
Chemical structure	Name	Description
	Epinephrine (adrenalin)	Combination of catechol nucleus, β-hydroxyl group and N-methyl group. These idendities give direct action and a strong affinity for all adrenergic receptors.
	Terbutaline	Combination of N-t-butyl and a resorcinol phenyl ring that gives potency to the β2-receptor.
	Albuterol (Salbutamol)	Has N-t-butyl and a salicyl alcohol phenyl ring which gives it optimal β2-selectivity. Salbutamol is a short-acting β2-agonist, but has a rapid onset of action. Its onset by inhalation is within 5 minutes. The hydroxyl group on the β-carbon is a mixture of S- and R-isomers, where the R-isomer is the active one. Another drug, Levalbuterol, has exactly the same structure. it contains only the R-isomer of Albutarol and is therefore much more active and the dose would be fourfold less for Levalbuterol than Albutarol.
	Salmeterol	Has a N-phenylbutoxyhexyl substituent, β-hydroxyl group and a salicyl phenyl ring that gives potency and direct selectivity for β2-receptor. The optimal position of the ether oxygen in the chain of Salmeterol for both potency and duration is six carbon atoms from the basic nitrogen.
	Formoterol	Has an N-isopropyl-p-methoxyphenyl group that gives direct-action to β-receptors. Formeterol also has a m-formamide and p—hydroxyphenyl ring, which gives selectivity to β2-receptors. Formeterol’s onset of action is about 20 minutes, but duration of action of 12 hours. If Formeterol is compared to Salmeterol then it has greater water solubility that allows it to get to receptor sites faster and the lipophilicity keeps it in the lungs longer. Formeterol has two asymmetric centers. The R,R-enantiomer is reported to be 1000 times more active than the S,S-enantiomer.
	Vilanterol	The latest drug on the market. It has similar structure to Salmeterol but also 2,6 dichlorobenzyl and two alkoxy groups on the N-chain. It has demonstrated similar selectivity as salmeterol for β2-receptor but greater selectivity compared to all other agonists tested. The intrinsic activity was demonstrated to be greater than salmeterol. Vilanterol is very potent and has a high potency. It has a fast onset of action and long duration of action. The inclusion of the extra alkoxy group on the side chain gives a potent β2-agonist that is rapidly metabolized in human liver. The 2,6-dichlorobenzyl seems to give greater potency, selectivity, rapid onset of action, long duration of action and rapid turnover.

== Synthesis of β_{2}-adrenoceptor agonists ==
The β_{2}-agonsist that are clinically used are all substituted β-phenethylamine (see figure 5) and they have three kinds of phenyl rings shown in figure 4. They are called resorcinol ring, salicyl alcohol ring or N-formamide ring. The alcohol substituents in the phenyl ring are reactive and complicate the synthesis of the β_{2}-agonists. A protection step is needed while the N-residue is added in position R1 (figure 5). Another thing that complicates the synthesis is obtaining optically pure R (-) enantiomer of the compound. The stereochemistry is very important for activity because only the R (-) enantiomer is able to form the hydrogen bonds necessary to fit in the binding site and activate the β_{2}-receptor.

Salbutamol is usually inhaled in racemic mixtures (for example Ventolin). By treating asthma with optically pure (R)-salbutamol the risk of side effects, such as nervous system stimulatory effects and cardiac arrhythmia, can be minimized. There are several routes for enantioselective synthesis, as well as methods for synthesis of the racemic mixture followed by chiral resolution.

Stereoselective synthesis of tributalin and salbutamol acetal can be done from O-protected-(R)-cyanohydrins. F. Effenberg, et al. describe a way for the synthesis. The main complications are to perform the deprotection step without racemization and to form a pure salt. A Ritter reaction can be used for an N-tertiary butylation. In this experiment deacetylation of (R)-salbutamol acetal was unsuccessful so it can not be used to obtain pure (R)-salbutamol. Figure 6 shows the main steps in the synthesis of salmeterol and tributalin.

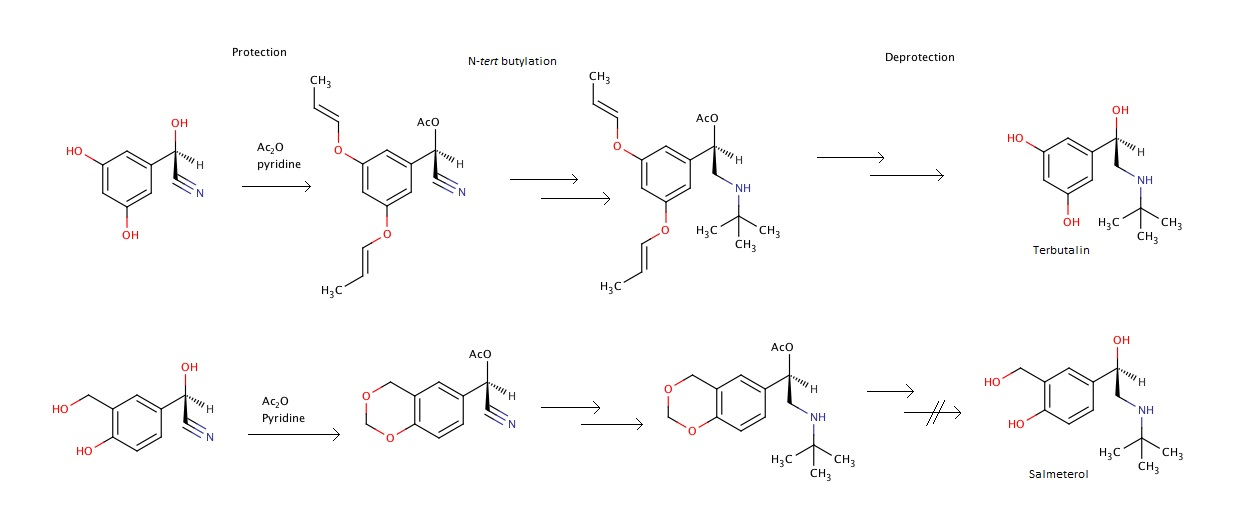
Figure 6: Synthesis of tributalin and salbutamol from cyanohydrins

== See also ==
- Beta2-adrenergic agonist
- Alpha-adrenergic agonist
- Asthma
- Beta blocker
- Beta-1 adrenergic receptor
- Beta-2 adrenergic receptor
- Beta-3 adrenergic receptor
- COPD
- Inhalation therapy
- GPCR
- Catecholamine
