= Beta2-adrenergic agonist =

Compounds that bind to and activate adrenergic beta-2 receptors

Salbutamol (albuterol) — an example of a β_{2} agonist

Beta_{2}-adrenergic agonists, also known as adrenergic β_{2} receptor agonists, are a class of drugs that act on the β_{2} adrenergic receptor. Like other β adrenergic agonists, they cause smooth muscle relaxation. β_{2} adrenergic agonists' effects on smooth muscle cause dilation of bronchial passages, vasodilation in muscle and liver, relaxation of uterine muscle. They are primarily used to treat asthma and other pulmonary disorders. Bronchodilators are considered an important treatment regime for chronic obstructive pulmonary disease (COPD) and are usually used in combination with short acting medications and long acting medications in a combined inhaler.

== Mechanism of action ==
Activation of β adrenergic receptors leads to relaxation of smooth muscle in the lung, and dilation and opening of the airways.

β adrenergic receptors are coupled to a stimulatory G protein of adenylyl cyclase. This enzyme produces the second messenger cyclic adenosine monophosphate (cAMP). In the lung, cAMP decreases calcium concentrations within cells and activates protein kinase A. Both of these changes inactivate myosin light-chain kinase and activate myosin light-chain phosphatase. In addition, β_{2} agonists open large conductance calcium-activated potassium channels and thereby tend to hyperpolarize airway smooth muscle cells. The combination of decreased intracellular calcium, increased membrane potassium conductance, and decreased myosin light chain kinase activity leads to smooth muscle relaxation and bronchodilation.

== Adverse effects ==
Findings indicate that β_{2} stimulants, especially in parenteral administration such as inhalation or injection, can induce adverse effects:

- Tachycardia secondary to peripheral vasodilation and cardiac stimulation (such tachycardia may be accompanied by palpitations)
- Tremor, excessive sweating, anxiety, insomnia, and agitation
- More severe effects include paradoxical bronchospasm, hypokalemia, and in rare cases a myocardial infarction. (More severe effects, such as pulmonary edema, myocardial ischemia, and cardiac arrhythmia, are exceptional.)

Overuse of β_{2} agonists and asthma treatment without proper inhaled corticosteroid use has been associated with an increased risk of asthma exacerbations and asthma-related hospitalizations.

== Delivery ==
Several β_{2} agonists are available in inhaler form, as either metered-dose inhalers which dispense an aerosolized drug and contains propellants, dry powder inhalers which dispense a powder to be inhaled, or soft mist inhalers which dispense a mist without use of propellants.

Salbutamol (INN) or albuterol (USAN) and some other β_{2} agonists, such as formoterol, also are sold in a solution form for nebulization, which is more commonly used than inhalers in emergency rooms. Nebulizers continuously deliver aerosolized drug and salbutamol delivered through nebulizer was found to be more effective than IV administration.

Salbutamol and terbutaline are also both available in oral forms. In addition, several of these medications are available in intravenous forms, including both salbutamol and terbutaline. It can be used in this form in severe cases of asthma, but it is more commonly used to suppress premature labor because it also relaxes uterine muscle, thereby inhibiting contractions.

== Risks ==
On 18 November 2005, the U.S. Food and Drug Administration (FDA) alerted healthcare professionals and patients that several long-acting bronchodilator medicines have been associated with possible increased risk of worsening wheezing in some people, and requested that manufacturers update warnings in their existing product labeling.

A 2006 meta-analysis found that "regularly inhaled β agonists (orciprenaline/metaproterenol [Alupent], formoterol [Foradil], fluticasone+salmeterol [Serevent, Advair], and salbutamol/albuterol [Proventil, Ventolin, Volmax, and others]) increased the risk of respiratory death more than two-fold, compared with a placebo," while used to treat chronic obstructive pulmonary disease. On 11 December 2008, a panel of experts convened by the FDA voted to ban drugs Serevent and Foradil from use in the treatment of asthma. When these two drugs are used without steroids, they increase the risks of more severe attacks. They said that two other, much more popular, asthma drugs containing long-acting β agonists—Advair and Symbicort—should continue to be used.

== Types ==
They can be divided into short-acting, long-acting, and ultra-long-acting β adrenoreceptor agonists:

Generic name	Trade name
Short-acting β_{2} agonists (SABAs)
bitolterol	Tornalate
fenoterol	Berotec
isoprenaline (INN) or isoproterenol (USAN)	Isuprel
levosalbutamol (INN) or levalbuterol (USAN)	Xopenex
orciprenaline (INN) or metaproterenol (USAN)	Alupent
pirbuterol	Maxair
procaterol	
ritodrine	Yutopar
salbutamol (INN) or albuterol (USAN)	Ventolin
terbutaline	Bricanyl
Long-acting β_{2} agonists (LABAs)
arformoterol	Brovana (some consider it to be an ultra-LABA)
bambuterol	Bambec, Oxeol
clenbuterol	Dilaterol, Spiropent
formoterol	Foradil, Oxis, Perforomist
salmeterol	Serevent
Ultra-long-acting β_{2} agonists
abediterol	
carmoterol	
indacaterol	Arcapta Neohaler (U.S.), Onbrez Breezhaler (EU, RU)
olodaterol	Striverdi Respimat
vilanterol
with umeclidinium bromide	Anoro Ellipta
with fluticasone furoate	Breo Ellipta (U.S.), Relvar Ellipta (EU, RU)
with fluticasone furoate and umeclidinium bromide	Trelegy Ellipta
Unknown duration of action
isoxsuprine	
mabuterol	
zilpaterol	Zilmax

== Research ==
New drugs in this class with more selective activity or that act simultaneously as muscarinic receptor antagonists are under development as of 2023.

== Society and culture ==
β_{2} agonists are used by athletes and bodybuilders as anabolic performance-enhancing drugs and their use has been banned by the World Anti-Doping Agency except for certain drugs that people with asthma may use; they are also used illegally to try to promote the growth of livestock. A 2011 meta-analysis found no evidence that inhaled β₂-agonists improve performance in healthy athletes and found that the evidence was too weak to assess whether systemic administration of β₂-agonists improved performance in healthy people.

== See also ==
- Discovery and development of β_{2} agonists
- β3-adrenergic agonist
