= Beta-2 adrenergic receptor =

Mammalian protein found in humans

ADRB2
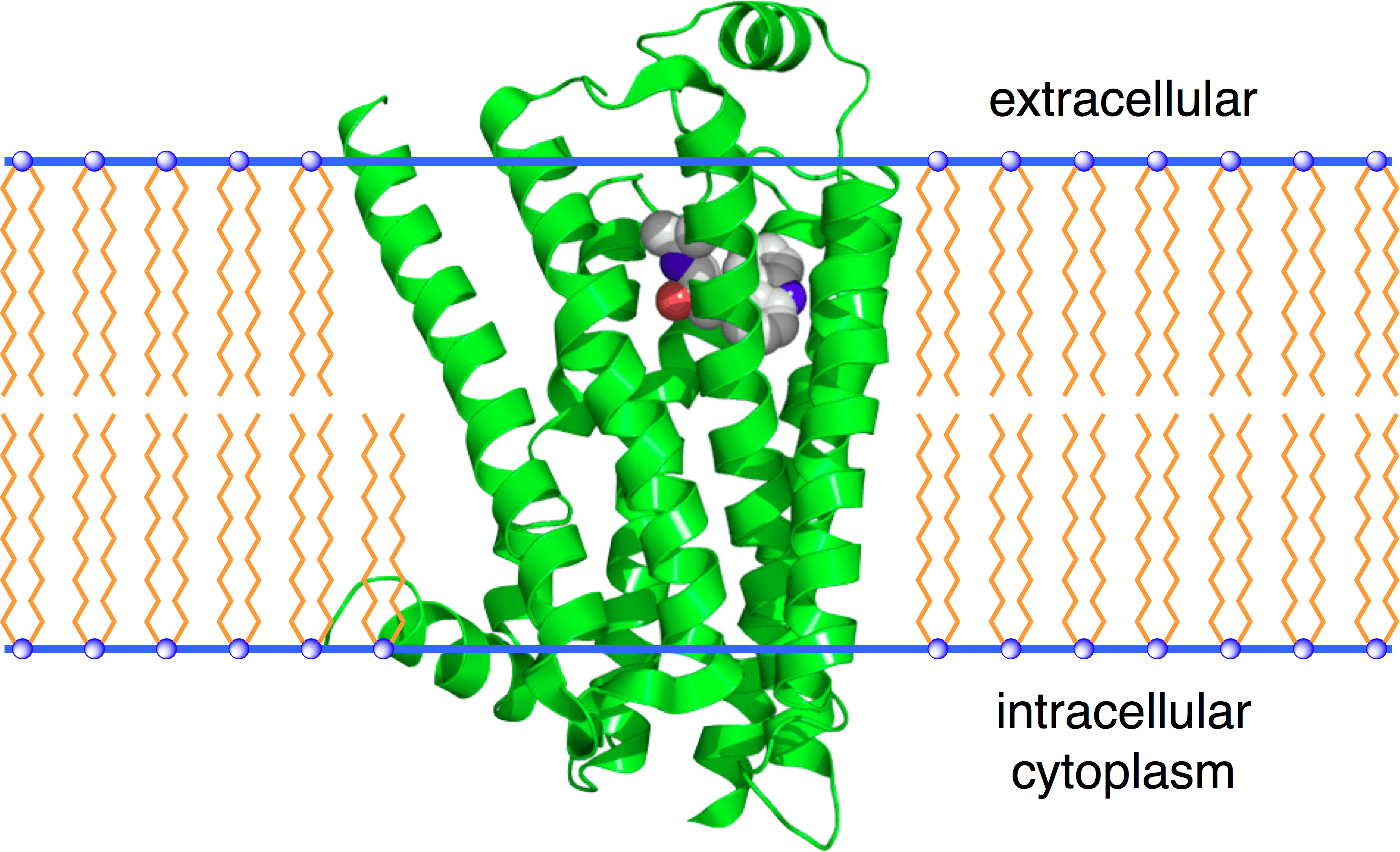

Identifiers
- Aliases: ADRB2, ADRB2R, ADRBR, B2AR, BAR, BETA2AR, adrenoceptor beta 2
- External IDs: OMIM: 109690; MGI: 87938; GeneCards: ADRB2
Available structures
PDB	Ortholog search: PDBe RCSB
PDB	List of PDB id codes 4QKX, 2R4R, 2R4S, 2RH1, 3D4S, 3KJ6, 3NY8, 3NY9, 3NYA, 3P0G, 3PDS, 3SN6, 4GBR, 4LDE, 4LDL, 4LDO, 5D5A, 5D5B, 5JQH

Gene location (Human)
Chr.	Chromosome 5 (human)
Band	5q32	Start	148,826,611 bp
Band	5q32	End	148,828,623 bp

Gene location (Mouse)
Chr.	Chromosome 18 (mouse)
Band	18 E1|18 35.1 cM	Start	62,310,887 bp
Band	18 E1|18 35.1 cM	End	62,313,030 bp
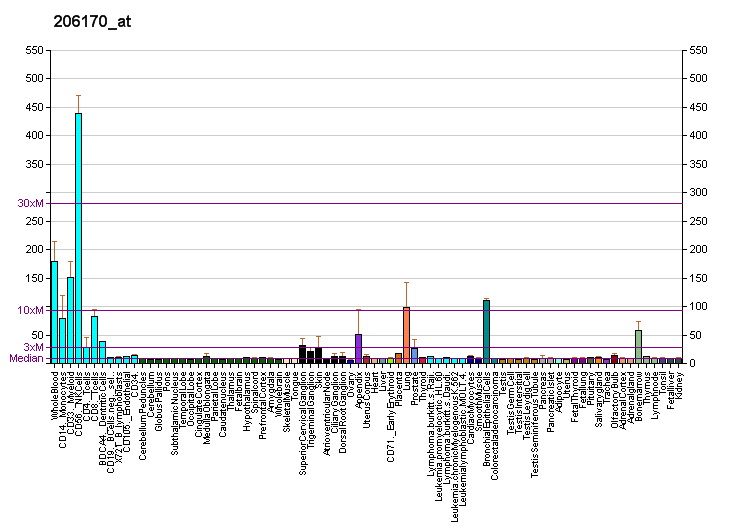
RNA expression pattern
Bgee	Human / Mouse (ortholog); Top expressed in: cartilage tissue; granulocyte; skin of thigh; gingival epithelium; palpebral conjunctiva; skin of abdomen; lower lobe of lung; right lung; subcutaneous adipose tissue; Skeletal muscle tissue of biceps brachii / Top expressed in: granulocyte; corneal stroma; left lung lobe; stroma of bone marrow; right lung; right lung lobe; muscle of thigh; intercostal muscle; blood; spleen; More reference expression data
BioGPS	More reference expression data
Gene ontology
Molecular function	adenylate cyclase binding; adrenergic receptor activity; beta2-adrenergic receptor activity; enzyme binding; protein homodimerization activity; potassium channel regulator activity; protein binding; G protein-coupled receptor activity; signal transducer activity; norepinephrine binding; epinephrine binding; amyloid-beta binding; protein-containing complex binding
Cellular component	endosome; membrane; nucleus; apical plasma membrane; lysosome; integral component of membrane; receptor complex; plasma membrane; early endosome; integral component of plasma membrane; endosome membrane; clathrin-coated vesicle membrane
Biological process	positive regulation of autophagosome maturation; adenylate cyclase-activating G protein-coupled receptor signaling pathway; regulation of sodium ion transport; endosome to lysosome transport; receptor-mediated endocytosis; cell surface receptor signaling pathway; regulation of systemic arterial blood pressure by norepinephrine-epinephrine; negative regulation of smooth muscle contraction; regulation of smooth muscle contraction; adenylate cyclase-modulating G protein-coupled receptor signaling pathway; bone resorption; adenylate cyclase-activating adrenergic receptor signaling pathway; heat generation; desensitization of G protein-coupled receptor signaling pathway by arrestin; positive regulation of MAPK cascade; G protein-coupled receptor signaling pathway; positive regulation of bone mineralization; activation of adenylate cyclase activity; brown fat cell differentiation; activation of transmembrane receptor protein tyrosine kinase activity; positive regulation of protein ubiquitination; negative regulation of multicellular organism growth; cell-cell signaling; diet induced thermogenesis; norepinephrine-epinephrine-mediated vasodilation involved in regulation of systemic arterial blood pressure; positive regulation of lipophagy; response to cold; positive regulation of transcription by RNA polymerase II; signal transduction; protein deubiquitination; membrane organization; adrenergic receptor signaling pathway; blood vessel diameter maintenance; positive regulation of protein kinase A signaling; positive regulation of mini excitatory postsynaptic potential; positive regulation of protein serine/threonine kinase activity; positive regulation of cold-induced thermogenesis; cellular response to amyloid-beta; response to psychosocial stress; positive regulation of cAMP-dependent protein kinase activity; positive regulation of AMPA receptor activity
Sources:Amigo / QuickGO
Orthologs
Databases	NCBI: entry; OMA: entry
Species	Human	Mouse
Entrez	154	11555
Ensembl	ENSG00000169252	ENSMUSG00000045730
UniProt	P07550	P18762
RefSeq (mRNA)	NM_000024	NM_007420
RefSeq (protein)	NP_000015	NP_031446
Location (UCSC)	Chr 5: 148.83 – 148.83 Mb	Chr 18: 62.31 – 62.31 Mb
PubMed search
- Wikidata
View/Edit Human	View/Edit Mouse

The beta-2 adrenergic receptor (β_{2} adrenoreceptor), also known as ADRB2, is a cell membrane-spanning beta-adrenergic receptor that binds epinephrine (adrenaline), a hormone and neurotransmitter whose signaling, via adenylate cyclase stimulation through trimeric G_{s} proteins, increases cAMP, and, via downstream L-type calcium channel interaction, mediates physiologic responses such as smooth muscle relaxation and bronchodilation.

Robert Lefkowitz and Brian Kobilka's study of the beta-2 adrenergic receptor as a model system earned them the 2012 Nobel Prize in Chemistry "for studies of G-protein-coupled receptors".

The official symbol for the human gene encoding the β_{2} adrenoreceptor is ADRB2.

== Gene ==
The ADRB2 gene is intronless. Different polymorphic forms, point mutations, and/or downregulation of this gene are associated with nocturnal asthma, obesity and type 2 diabetes.

== Structure ==
The 3D crystallographic structure (see figure and links to the right) of the β_{2}-adrenergic receptor has been determined by making a fusion protein with lysozyme to increase the hydrophilic surface area of the protein for crystal contacts. An alternative method, involving production of a fusion protein with an agonist, supported lipid-bilayer co-crystallization and generation of a 3.5 Å resolution structure.

The crystal structure of the β_{2}Adrenergic Receptor-G_{s} protein complex was solved in 2011. The largest conformational changes in the β2AR include a 14 Å outward movement at the cytoplasmic end of transmembrane segment 6 (TM6) and an alpha helical extension of the cytoplasmic end of TM5.

== Mechanism ==
This receptor is directly associated with one of its ultimate effectors, the class C L-type calcium channel Ca_{V}1.2. This receptor-channel complex is coupled to the G_{s} G protein, which activates adenylyl cyclase, catalysing the formation of cyclic adenosine monophosphate (cAMP) which then activates protein kinase A, and counterbalancing phosphatase PP2A. Protein kinase A then goes on to phosphorylate (and thus inactivate) myosin light-chain kinase, which causes smooth muscle relaxation, accounting for the vasodilatory effects of beta 2 stimulation. The assembly of the signaling complex provides a mechanism that ensures specific and rapid signaling. A two-state biophysical and molecular model has been proposed to account for the pH and REDOX sensitivity of this and other GPCRs.

Beta-2 adrenergic receptors have also been found to couple with G_{i}, possibly providing a mechanism by which response to ligand is highly localized within cells. In contrast, Beta-1 adrenergic receptors are coupled only to G_{s}, and stimulation of these results in a more diffuse cellular response. This appears to be mediated by cAMP induced PKA phosphorylation of the receptor. Interestingly, Beta-2 adrenergic receptor was observed to localize exclusively to the T-tubular network of adult cardiomyocytes, as opposed to Beta-1 adrenergic receptor, which is observed also on the outer plasma membrane of the cell

== Function ==
Function	Tissue	Biological role
Smooth muscle relaxation in:	GI tract (decreases motility)	Inhibition of digestion
Smooth muscle relaxation in:	Bronchi	Facilitation of respiration.
Smooth muscle relaxation in:	Relaxes Detrusor urinae muscle of bladder wall This effect is stronger than the alpha-1 receptor effect of contraction.	Inhibition of need for micturition
Smooth muscle relaxation in:	Uterus	Inhibition of labor
Smooth muscle relaxation in:	Seminal tract	
Increased perfusion and vasodilation	Blood vessels and arteries to skeletal muscle including the smaller coronary arteries and hepatic artery	Facilitation of muscle contraction and motility
Increased mass and contraction speed	Striated muscle	Facilitation of muscle contraction and motility
Insulin and glucagon secretion	Pancreas	Increased blood glucose and uptake by skeletal muscle
Glycogenolysis		Increased blood glucose and uptake by skeletal muscle
Tremor	Motor nerve terminals. Tremor is mediated by PKA mediated facilitation of presynaptic Ca^{2+} influx leading to acetylcholine release.	

Legend
The function facilitates the fight-or-flight response.

=== Musculoskeletal system ===
Activation of the β_{2} adrenoreceptor with long-acting agents such as oral clenbuterol and intravenously-infused albuterol results in skeletomuscular hypertrophy and anabolism. The comprehensive anabolic, lipolytic, and ergogenic effects of long-acting β_{2} agonists such as clenbuterol render them frequent targets as performance-enhancing drugs in athletes. Consequently, such agents are monitored for and generally banned by WADA (World Anti-Doping Agency) with limited permissible usage under therapeutic exemptions; clenbuterol and other β_{2} adrenergic agents remain banned not as a beta-agonist, but rather an anabolic agent. These effects are largely attractive within agricultural contexts insofar that β_{2} adrenergic agents have seen notable extra-label usage in food-producing animals and livestock. While many countries including the United States have prohibited extra-label usage in food-producing livestock, the practice is still observed in many countries.

=== Circulatory system ===
- Heart muscle contraction
- Increase cardiac output (minor degree compared to β_{1}).
  - Increases heart rate in sinoatrial node (SA node) (chronotropic effect).
  - Increases atrial cardiac muscle contractility. (inotropic effect).
  - Increases contractility and automaticity of ventricular cardiac muscle.
- Dilate hepatic artery.
- Dilate arterioles to skeletal muscle.

=== Eye ===
In the normal eye, beta-2 stimulation by salbutamol increases intraocular pressure via net:

- Increase in production of aqueous humour by the ciliary process,
- Subsequent increased pressure-dependent uveoscleral outflow of humour, despite reduced drainage of humour via the Canal of Schlemm.

In glaucoma, drainage is reduced (open-angle glaucoma) or blocked completely (closed-angle glaucoma). In such cases, beta-2 stimulation with its consequent increase in humour production is highly contra-indicated, and conversely, a topical beta-2 antagonist such as timolol may be employed.

=== Digestive system ===
- Glycogenolysis and gluconeogenesis in liver.
- Glycogenolysis and lactate release in skeletal muscle.
- Contract sphincters of Gastrointestinal tract.
- Thickened secretions from salivary glands.
- Insulin and glucagon secretion from pancreas.

=== Other ===
- Inhibit histamine-release from mast cells.
- Increase protein content of secretions from lacrimal glands.
- Receptor also present in cerebellum.
- Bronchiole dilation (targeted while treating asthma attacks)
- Involved in brain - immune - communication

== Ligands ==
=== Agonists ===
Beta-2 adrenergic receptor
- Transduction mechanisms: Primary: G_{s} Secondary: G_{i/o}
- Primary endogenous agonists: epinephrine, norepinephrine
- Agonists: isoprenaline, salbutamol, salmeterol, others
- Antagonists: carvedilol, propranolol, labetalol, others
- Inverse agonists: N/A
- Positive allosteric modulators: Zn^{2+} (low concentrations)
- Negative allosteric modulators: Zn^{2+} (high concentrations)

External resources
- IUPHAR/BPS: 29
- DrugBank: P07550
- HMDB: HMDBP01634

==== Spasmolytics used in asthma and COPD ====
- Short-acting β_{2} agonists (SABA)
  - bitolterol
  - fenoterol
  - hexoprenaline
  - isoprenaline (INN) or isoproterenol (USAN)
  - levosalbutamol (INN) or levalbuterol (USAN)
  - orciprenaline (INN) or metaproterenol (USAN)
  - pirbuterol
  - procaterol
  - salbutamol (INN) or albuterol (USAN)
  - terbutaline
- Long-acting β_{2} agonists (LABA)
  - arformoterol (some consider it to be an ultra-LABA)
  - bambuterol
  - clenbuterol
  - formoterol
  - salmeterol
- Ultra-long-acting β_{2} agonists (ultra-LABA)
  - carmoterol
  - indacaterol
  - milveterol (GSK 159797)
  - olodaterol
  - vilanterol (GSK 642444)

==== Tocolytic agents ====
- Short-acting β_{2} agonists (SABA)
  - fenoterol
  - hexoprenaline
  - isoxsuprine
  - ritodrine
  - salbutamol (INN) or albuterol (USAN)
  - terbutaline

==== β_{2} agonists used for other purposes ====
- zilpaterol

=== Antagonists ===
(Beta blockers)

- butoxamine*
- First generation (non-selective) β-blockers
- ICI-118,551*
- Propranolol

* denotes selective antagonist to the receptor.

=== Allosteric modulators ===
- compound-6FA, PAM at intracellular binding site
- Cellular swelling

== Interactions ==
Beta-2 adrenergic receptor has been shown to interact with:

- AKAP12,
- OPRD1,
- Grb2,
- SNX27 and
- SLC9A3R1.

== See also ==
- Other adrenergic receptors
  - Alpha-1 adrenergic receptor
  - Alpha-2 adrenergic receptor
  - Beta-1 adrenergic receptor
  - Beta-3 adrenergic receptor
- Discovery and development of beta2 agonists
