= Long-acting beta-adrenoceptor agonist =

Drug prescribed for asthma patients

- Drug class
- Salmeterol—an example of long-acting β_{2} adrenoreceptor agonist

Legal status

Long-acting β adrenoceptor agonists (LABAs) are beta-adrenergic agonists usually prescribed for moderate-to-severe persistent asthma and chronic obstructive pulmonary disease (COPD).

LABAs are designed to reduce the need for shorter-acting β_{2} agonists such as salbutamol (albuterol), as they have an approximately twelve-hour duration of action, compared to about five hours for salbutamol, making them candidates for sparing high doses of corticosteroids or treating nocturnal asthma and providing symptomatic relief for COPD patients.

With the exception of formoterol, LABAs are not recommended for the treatment of acute asthma exacerbations because of their slower onset of action compared to salbutamol. Salmeterol binds to an exosite on the β_{2} adrenergic receptor, and this has been proposed to explain its long duration of action, but this hypothesis is not universally accepted.

== Medical uses ==
When combined with inhaled steroids, β adrenoceptor agonists can improve symptoms. In children this benefit is uncertain and they may be potentially harmful. They should not be used without an accompanying steroid due to an increased risk of severe symptoms, including exacerbation in both children and adults. A 2018 meta-analysis was unable to determine whether an increase serious adverse events reported in the previous meta-analysis on regular salmeterol alone is abolished by the additional use of regular inhaled corticosteroid. Large surveillance studies are ongoing to provide more information. There were no asthma-related deaths and few asthma-related serious adverse events when salmeterol is used with an inhaled steroid. At least with formoterol, an increased risk appears to be present even when steroids are used and this risk has not been ruled out for salmeterol.

Because LABAs work so well at dulling the sensation of breathlessness, they can mask underlying airway inflammation.

== Agents ==
Some of the currently available long-acting β_{2} adrenoceptor agonists include:
International nonproprietary name (INN): Trade (brand) name

- arformoterol: Brovana (some consider it to be an ultra-LABA)
- bambuterol: Bambec, Oxeol
- clenbuterol: Dilaterol, Spiropent
- formoterol: Foradil, Oxis, Perforomist
- salmeterol: Serevent
- protokylol: Ventaire

== Ultra-LABAs ==
Several long-acting β adrenoreceptor agonists have a duration of action of 24 hours, allowing for once-daily dosing. They are considered to be ultra-long-acting β adrenoreceptor agonists (ultra-LABAs) and are now approved.

- indacaterol: approved by the European Medicines Agency (EMA) on November 30, 2009, and by Russian FDA-equivalent under the trade name Onbrez Breezhaler. In the United States. it was approved by the Food and Drug Administration (FDA) under the trade name Arcapta Neohaler on July 1, 2011)
- olodaterol: approved in some European countries and Russia, and by the U.S. Food and Drug Administration (FDA) on July 31, 2014, under Striverdi Respimat
- vilanterol is the ultra-LABA not available by itself but only as a component of combination drugs:
  - with fluticasone furoate: Breo Ellipta (U.S.), Relvar Ellipta (EU, RU). This second medication in this combination is the synthetic inhaled corticosteroid fluticasone furoate. This product was approved by the FDA in May 2013 as once-daily inhaled therapy for the treatment of chronic obstructive pulmonary disease (COPD)
  - with umeclidinium bromide: Anoro Ellipta. Umeclidinium bromide is a long-acting muscarinic antagonist. This combination was approved by the FDA on December 18, 2013 for the long-term maintenance treatment of COPD. On March 28, 2014, it was approved in European countries and in Russia under the same trade name.

=== Under development ===
- abediterol (codenamed LAS100977)
- salmefamol (salbutamol and para-methoxyamphetamine (PMA) hybrid)

=== Failed agents ===
- carmoterol (formerly TA-2005): development terminated
- PF-610355: development terminated

== Concerns ==
A meta-analysis study from 2006 (pooled results of 19 trials, 33,826 participants) raised concerns that salmeterol may increase the risk of death in asthmatics, and that the additional risk was not reduced with the adjunctive use of inhaled steroids (e.g., as with the combination product fluticasone/salmeterol). The proposed mechanism is that while LABAs relieve asthma symptoms, they can also promote bronchial inflammation and sensitivity without warning. On February 18, 2011, the FDA issued a safety alert for long-acting β agonists. Following new clinical safety trials, the FDA issued updated guidance on 20 December 2017, that there is no significant increased risk of serious asthma outcomes with LABAs when used together with inhaled corticosteroids.
