= Navafenterol =

Chemical compound

Identifiers
- IUPAC name: [4-[3-[5-[[[(2R)-2-hydroxy-2-(8-hydroxy-2-oxo-1H-quinolin-5-yl)ethyl]amino]methyl]benzotriazol-1-yl]propyl-methylamino]cyclohexyl] 2-hydroxy-2,2-dithiophen-2-ylacetate
- CAS Number: 1435519-06-4
- PubChem CID: 71558565
- UNII: U29GY32XJ4
- KEGG: D11900
- ChEMBL: ChEMBL4297483

Chemical and physical data
- Formula: C_{38}H_{42}N_{6}O_{6}S_{2}
- Molar mass: 742.91 g·mol^{−1}
- 3D model (JSmol): Interactive image
- SMILES: CN(CCCN1C2=C(C=C(C=C2)CNC[C@@H](C3=C4C=CC(=O)NC4=C(C=C3)O)O)N=N1)C5CCC(CC5)OC(=O)C(C6=CC=CS6)(C7=CC=CS7)O
- InChI: InChI=InChI=1S/C38H42N6O6S2/c1-43(25-8-10-26(11-9-25)50-37(48)38(49,33-5-2-19-51-33)34-6-3-20-52-34)17-4-18-44-30-14-7-24(21-29(30)41-42-44)22-39-23-32(46)27-12-15-31(45)36-28(27)13-16-35(47)40-36/h2-3,5-7,12-16,19-21,25-26,32,39,45-46,49H,4,8-11,17-18,22-23H2,1H3,(H,40,47)/t25?,26?,32-/m0/s1; Key:ZNKWRAKPQQZLNX-FFJARJNZSA-N

Navafenterol is an investigational drug that had been evaluated for chronic obstructive pulmonary disease. It is a Beta2 agonist and a muscarinic antagonist. Further development has been discontinued for strategic reasons.
