= S-1226 =

Bronchodilator for the treatment of respiratory diseases

S-1226, or S1226, is a mixture of carbon dioxide-enriched air and nebulized perflubron being developed as a novel bronchodilator for use in respiratory diseases such as asthma, cystic fibrosis, and COVID-19 by SolAeroMed.

Unlike typical bronchodilators such as β_{2}-adrenergic agonists and antimuscarinics, S-1226 does not act on receptors in the airways. Instead, it combines the bronchodilator activity of gaseous carbon dioxide with the mucolytic properties of the synthetic surfactant perflubron to relax the smooth musculature of the airways, clear excess mucus, and reduce inflammation. Thus, S-1226 represents a novel class of bronchodilators that could alleviate certain problems of existing therapeutics, such as the buildup of tolerance to their effects and their inefficient penetration of airway mucus.

== Clinical studies ==
=== Asthma ===
S-1226 has completed phase I and II clinical trials for the treatment of acute asthma exacerbations caused by exposure to allergens.

==== Phase I ====
The phase I randomized double-blind placebo-controlled trial designed to assess the safety of S-1226 compared 3 different formulations of S-1226 containing varying concentrations of carbon dioxide (4%, 8%, and 12%) to a placebo. No serious adverse events were reported, though S-1226 caused a greater number of related adverse events than did the placebo. These events were attributed by the investigators to the carbon dioxide constituent of S-1226.

==== Phase II ====
The phase II randomized double-blind placebo-controlled cross-over trial was designed to further assess the safety and to provide preliminary evidence of efficacy of S-1226 in treating acute asthma exacerbations caused by exposure to allergens. The 8% carbon dioxide formulation of S-1226 was used in this study due to its favourable efficacy in animal studies and favourable safety in the phase I trial. The trial enrolled 12 patients with mild allergic asthma who were randomised to either receive S-1226 (8% carbon dioxide) or placebo. After the first treatment period and a washout period of 14 days, the group initially randomised to S-1226 received placebo, and vice versa in the second treatment period.

No serious adverse events were reported. The placebo group experienced a gradual lowering of peripheral blood oxygenation levels, while the S-1226 intervention group did not. The S-1226 intervention group regained their initial FEV_{1} (the volume of air a person can forcibly exhale in 1 second) more rapidly than the placebo group following allergen exposure.

=== Cystic fibrosis ===
As of December 2023, SolAeroMed were recruiting patients with cystic fibrosis for a phase II trial of S-1226.
