= Colterol =

Chemical compound

Clinical data
- Other names: N-tert-Butylarterenol; N-tert-Butylnoradrenaline

Identifiers
- IUPAC name: 4-[2-(tert-Butylamino)-1-hydroxyethyl]benzene-1,2-diol
- CAS Number: 18866-78-9
- PubChem CID: 25104
- ChemSpider: 23451
- UNII: 1WH11068UO
- CompTox Dashboard (EPA): DTXSID40864860

Chemical and physical data
- Formula: C_{12}H_{19}NO_{3}
- Molar mass: 225.288 g·mol^{−1}
- 3D model (JSmol): Interactive image
- SMILES: CC(C)(C)NCC(C1=CC(=C(C=C1)O)O)O
- InChI: InChI=1S/C12H19NO3/c1-12(2,3)13-7-11(16)8-4-5-9(14)10(15)6-8/h4-6,11,13-16H,7H2,1-3H3; Key:PHSMOUBHYUFTDM-UHFFFAOYSA-N

Colterol is a short-acting β2-adrenoreceptor agonist. Bitolterol, a prodrug for colterol, is used in the management of bronchospasm in asthma and chronic obstructive pulmonary disease (COPD).

== Patents ==
- Roche
- National Research Council Canada
