= Norbudrine =

Sympathomimetic drug

Clinical data
- Other names: Norbutrine; RD-9338; N-Cyclobutylnoradrenaline; N-Cyclobutylnorepinephrine
- Drug class: Sympathomimetic; Bronchodilator

Identifiers
- IUPAC name: 4-[2-(cyclobutylamino)-1-hydroxyethyl]benzene-1,2-diol
- CAS Number: 15686-81-4 13329-35-6 (hydrochloride)
- PubChem CID: 166575
- ChemSpider: 145768
- UNII: 8P6T83567P
- ChEMBL: ChEMBL2106796
- CompTox Dashboard (EPA): DTXSID50864619

Chemical and physical data
- Formula: C_{12}H_{17}NO_{3}
- Molar mass: 223.272 g·mol^{−1}
- 3D model (JSmol): Interactive image
- SMILES: C1CC(C1)NCC(C2=CC(=C(C=C2)O)O)O
- InChI: InChI=1S/C12H17NO3/c14-10-5-4-8(6-11(10)15)12(16)7-13-9-2-1-3-9/h4-6,9,12-16H,1-3,7H2; Key:OVTZNVCECJYMDW-UHFFFAOYSA-N

Norbudrine (INN; also known as norbutrine (BAN) or as N-cyclobutylnoradrenaline) is a drug of the phenethylamine and catecholamine families described as a sympathomimetic and bronchodilator which was never marketed. It is the N-cyclobutyl analogue of norepinephrine (noradrenaline). The drug was first described in the literature by 1966.
