= Salmefamol =

Adrenergic bronchodilator

Clinical data
- Other names: AH-3923; AHR-3929; 1-(4-hydroxy-3-(hydroxymethyl)phenyl)-2-(4-methoxy-α-methylphenethylamino)ethanol
- Routes of administration: Inhalation, intravenous
- Drug class: Bronchodilator; β-Adrenergic receptor agonist

Identifiers
- IUPAC name: 4-[1-hydroxy-2-[1-(4-methoxyphenyl)propan-2-ylamino]ethyl]-2-(hydroxymethyl)phenol
- CAS Number: 18910-65-1
- PubChem CID: 86805
- ChemSpider: 78303
- UNII: Q56SEY8X9J
- KEGG: C11771
- ChEMBL: ChEMBL2107072
- CompTox Dashboard (EPA): DTXSID80864864

Chemical and physical data
- Formula: C_{19}H_{25}NO_{4}
- Molar mass: 331.412 g·mol^{−1}
- 3D model (JSmol): Interactive image
- SMILES: CC(CC1=CC=C(C=C1)OC)NCC(C2=CC(=C(C=C2)O)CO)O
- InChI: InChI=1S/C19H25NO4/c1-13(9-14-3-6-17(24-2)7-4-14)20-11-19(23)15-5-8-18(22)16(10-15)12-21/h3-8,10,13,19-23H,9,11-12H2,1-2H3; Key:VPMWDFRZSIMDKW-UHFFFAOYSA-N

Salmefamol (INN, BAN; developmental code name AH-3923) is a drug of the phenethylamine and amphetamine families described as a bronchodilator which was never marketed. It is a β-adrenergic receptor agonist with some selectivity for the β_{2}-adrenergic receptor and has been described as a "sister compound" to salbutamol. However, the drug is more potent (1.5-fold), longer-acting (6 hours), and more lipophilic in comparison to salbutamol. It was intended for inhalational or intravenous administration. Salmefamol was first described in the literature by 1968.
