= AKAP12 =

Protein-coding gene in the species Homo sapiens

Identifiers
- Aliases: AKAP12, AKAP250, SSeCKS, A-kinase anchoring protein 12
- External IDs: OMIM: 604698; MGI: 1932576; HomoloGene: 3740; GeneCards: AKAP12; OMA:AKAP12 - orthologs

Gene location (Human)
Chr.	Chromosome 6 (human)
Band	6q25.1	Start	151,239,967 bp
Band	6q25.1	End	151,358,559 bp

Gene location (Mouse)
Chr.	Chromosome 10 (mouse)
Band	10|10 A1	Start	4,216,380 bp
Band	10|10 A1	End	4,309,470 bp
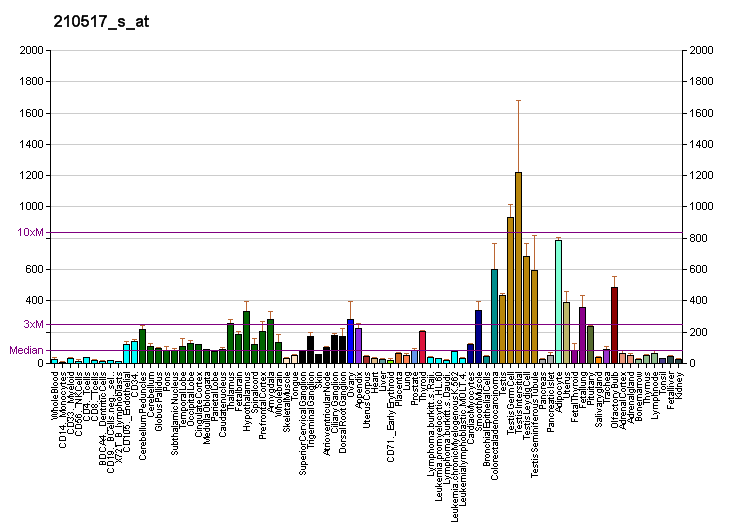
RNA expression pattern
Bgee	Human / Mouse (ortholog); Top expressed in: pons; lateral nuclear group of thalamus; spinal ganglia; trigeminal ganglion; vena cava; pars compacta; saphenous vein; superior vestibular nucleus; pericardium; epithelium of colon / Top expressed in: efferent ductule; seminiferous tubule; vas deferens; stroma of bone marrow; external carotid artery; left lung lobe; spermatid; superior cervical ganglion; endothelial cell of lymphatic vessel; dermis; More reference expression data
BioGPS	More reference expression data
Gene ontology
Molecular function	protein kinase A binding; protein binding; adenylate cyclase binding
Cellular component	plasma membrane; cell cortex; cytoskeleton; membrane; focal adhesion; cytoplasm; cytosol; Schaffer collateral - CA1 synapse; soma
Biological process	protein targeting; G protein-coupled receptor signaling pathway; regulation of protein kinase C signaling; signal transduction; positive regulation of protein kinase A signaling; adenylate cyclase-inhibiting G protein-coupled receptor signaling pathway; regulation of protein kinase A signaling; modulation of chemical synaptic transmission; response to lipopolysaccharide; hepatic stellate cell activation; negative regulation of vascular permeability; response to electrical stimulus; positive regulation of nitric-oxide synthase biosynthetic process; positive regulation of hepatic stellate cell migration; positive regulation of ERK1 and ERK2 cascade; cellular response to interleukin-1; cellular response to tumor necrosis factor; positive regulation of oligodendrocyte apoptotic process
Sources:Amigo / QuickGO
Orthologs
Species	Human	Mouse
Entrez	9590	83397
Ensembl	ENSG00000131016	ENSMUSG00000038587
UniProt	Q02952	Q9WTQ5
RefSeq (mRNA)	NM_005100; NM_144497; NM_001370346	NM_031185
RefSeq (protein)	NP_005091; NP_653080; NP_001357275	NP_112462
Location (UCSC)	Chr 6: 151.24 – 151.36 Mb	Chr 10: 4.22 – 4.31 Mb
PubMed search
- Wikidata
View/Edit Human	View/Edit Mouse

A-kinase anchor protein 12, aka AKAP250, is an enzyme that in humans is encoded by the AKAP12 gene.

== Function ==
The A-kinase anchor proteins (AKAPs) are a group of structurally diverse proteins, which have the common function of binding to the regulatory subunit of protein kinase A (PKA) and confining the holoenzyme to discrete locations within the cell. This gene encodes a member of the AKAP family. The encoded protein is expressed in endothelial cells, cultured fibroblasts, and osteosarcoma cells. It associates with protein kinase A and C and phosphatase, and serves as a scaffold protein in signal transduction. This protein and RII PKA colocalize at the cell periphery. This protein is a cell growth-related protein. Antibodies to this protein can be produced by patients with myasthenia gravis. Alternative splicing of this gene results in two transcript variants encoding different isoforms.

== Interactions ==
AKAP12 has been shown to interact with Beta-2 adrenergic receptor.
