= PF-610355 =

Respiratory medication

Clinical data
- Routes of administration: Inhalation
- ATC code: None

Legal status
- Legal status: Development terminated

Identifiers
- IUPAC name: N-[(4'-Hydroxy-3-biphenylyl)methyl]-2-[3-(2-{[(2R)-2-hydroxy-2-{4-hydroxy-3-[(methylsulfonyl)amino]phenyl}ethyl]amino}-2-methylpropyl)phenyl]acetamide
- CAS Number: 862541-45-5
- PubChem CID: 11505444
- ChemSpider: 9680243
- UNII: ZH5SMU97AJ
- ChEMBL: ChEMBL1240967
- CompTox Dashboard (EPA): DTXSID501099960

Chemical and physical data
- Formula: C_{34}H_{39}N_{3}O_{6}S
- Molar mass: 617.76 g·mol^{−1}

PF-610355 (also known as PF-00610355 or PF-610,355) is an inhalable ultra-long-acting β_{2} adrenoreceptor agonist (ultra-LABA) that was investigated as a treatment of asthma and COPD by Pfizer. It utilizes a sulfonamide agonist headgroup, that confers high levels of intrinsic crystallinity that could relate to the acidic sulfonamide motif supporting a zwitterionic form in the solid state. Optimization of pharmacokinetic properties minimized systemic exposure following inhalation and reduced systemically mediated adverse events. Its in vivo duration on action confirmed its potential for once-daily use in humans.

The investigation and development of PF-610355 were discontinued in 2011, likely for strategic and regulatory reasons.
