= Protokylol =

Chemical compound

Clinical data
- Trade names: Ventaire
- Drug class: β-Adrenergic receptor agonist; Bronchodilator
- ATC code: None

Legal status
- Legal status: In general: ℞ (Prescription only)

Identifiers
- IUPAC name: 4-[2-[[2-(1,3-Benzodioxol-5-yl)-1-methyl-ethyl]amino]-1-hydroxy-ethyl]benzene-1,2-diol
- CAS Number: 136-70-9
- PubChem CID: 4969
- ChemSpider: 4798
- UNII: 8Y5Y4EEO2V
- ChEMBL: ChEMBL1201273
- CompTox Dashboard (EPA): DTXSID20861796
- ECHA InfoCard: 100.004.778

Chemical and physical data
- Formula: C_{18}H_{21}NO_{5}
- Molar mass: 331.368 g·mol^{−1}
- 3D model (JSmol): Interactive image
- SMILES: O1c2ccc(cc2OC1)CC(NCC(O)c3ccc(O)c(O)c3)C

Protokylol, sold under the brand name Ventaire, is a β-adrenergic receptor agonist used as a bronchodilator in Europe and the United States.

It is methylenedioxyphenyl-isoproterenol.

The Para-Methoxyamphetamine (PMA) analog is twice the potency as the tenamfetamine analog.

== See also ==
- Substituted methylenedioxyphenethylamine
