= Carmoterol =

Chemical compound

Clinical data
- Other names: TA-2005; CHF-4226
- Routes of administration: Inhalation
- ATC code: None

Legal status
- Legal status: Development terminated

Identifiers
- IUPAC name: 8-Hydroxy-5-[(1R)-1-hydroxy-2-[[(2R)-1-(4-methoxyphenyl)propan-2-yl]amino]ethyl]-1H-quinolin-2-one
- CAS Number: 147568-66-9
- PubChem CID: 63952
- IUPHAR/BPS: 7582
- ChemSpider: 57545
- UNII: 9810NUL4D1
- ChEMBL: ChEMBL1094785
- CompTox Dashboard (EPA): DTXSID201046374

Chemical and physical data
- Formula: C_{21}H_{24}N_{2}O_{4}
- Molar mass: 368.433 g·mol^{−1}
- 3D model (JSmol): Interactive image
- SMILES: C[C@H](CC1=CC=C(C=C1)OC)NC[C@@H](C2=C3C=CC(=O)NC3=C(C=C2)O)O
- InChI: InChI=1S/C21H24N2O4/c1-13(11-14-3-5-15(27-2)6-4-14)22-12-19(25)16-7-9-18(24)21-17(16)8-10-20(26)23-21/h3-10,13,19,22,24-25H,11-12H2,1-2H3,(H,23,26)/t13-,19+/m1/s1; Key:IHOXNOQMRZISPV-YJYMSZOUSA-N

Carmoterol (INN; development codes TA-2005 and CHF-4226) is a non-catechol experimental ultra-long-acting β adrenoreceptor agonist (ultra-LABA) that was in clinical trials before 2010 when it has been withdrawn from further development based on evidence that the compound does not possess a competitive profile.

Preliminary studies indicated duration of its effect exceeding 24 hours after inhalation of 3 μg. The pharmacologic profile of this medication included the fact its potency in isolated guinea pig trachea is greater than that of formoterol and salmeterol. It is over 100 times more selective for bronchial muscle than myocardial tissue.
