= Abediterol =

Chemical compound

Clinical data
- Routes of administration: Inhalation
- ATC code: None

Pharmacokinetic data
- Elimination half-life: 24.3 hours

Identifiers
- IUPAC name: 5-[(1R)-2-{[6-(2,2-Difluoro-2-phenylethoxy)hexyl]amino}-1-hydroxyethyl]-8-hydroxyquinolin-2(1H)-one
- CAS Number: 915133-65-2
- PubChem CID: 11962616
- IUPHAR/BPS: 9326
- ChemSpider: 10136846
- UNII: QXA167CM6F
- KEGG: D10219
- ChEBI: CHEBI:142077
- ChEMBL: ChEMBL3039530
- CompTox Dashboard (EPA): DTXSID60238605

Chemical and physical data
- Formula: C_{25}H_{30}F_{2}N_{2}O_{4}
- Molar mass: 460.522 g·mol^{−1}
- 3D model (JSmol): Interactive image
- SMILES: FC(F)(c1ccccc1)COCCCCCCNC[C@H](O)c3ccc(O)c2c3\C=C/C(=O)N2
- InChI: InChI=1S/C25H30F2N2O4/c26-25(27,18-8-4-3-5-9-18)17-33-15-7-2-1-6-14-28-16-22(31)19-10-12-21(30)24-20(19)11-13-23(32)29-24/h3-5,8-13,22,28,30-31H,1-2,6-7,14-17H2,(H,29,32)/t22-/m0/s1; Key:SFYAXIFVXBKRPK-QFIPXVFZSA-N

Abediterol (INN; development codes AZD-0548 and LAS 100977) is a once-daily experimental drug candidate for the treatment of asthma and chronic obstructive pulmonary disease (COPD), but it has never been marketed.

== History ==
Abediterol was under development by the Spanish pharmaceutical company Almirall and reached Phase II clinical trials, but was discontinued in 2021. Its coformulation with mometasone furoate also progressed to Phase II clinical trials, but was discontinued in 2019.

== Mechanism of action ==
Abediterol is an ultra-long-acting β_{2} agonist (ultra-LABA).
