= Orciprenaline =

Chemical compound

Clinical data
- Trade names: Alupent, Metaprel, Orcibest
- Other names: Metaproterenol (USAN US)
- AHFS/Drugs.com: Monograph
- MedlinePlus: a682084
- Pregnancy category: AU: A
- Routes of administration: By mouth, inhalation
- ATC code: R03AB03 (WHO) R03CB03 (WHO) R03CB53 (WHO)

Legal status
- Legal status: AU: S4 (Prescription only); US: ℞-only

Pharmacokinetic data
- Bioavailability: 3% if inhaled, 40% if taken orally
- Metabolism: Gastrointestinal and hepatic
- Elimination half-life: 6 hours

Identifiers
- IUPAC name: (RS)-5-[1-hydroxy-2-(isopropylamino)ethyl]benzene-1,3-diol
- CAS Number: 586-06-1
- PubChem CID: 4086
- IUPHAR/BPS: 7250
- DrugBank: DB00816
- ChemSpider: 3944
- UNII: 53QOG569E0
- KEGG: D08300
- ChEBI: CHEBI:82719
- ChEMBL: ChEMBL776
- CompTox Dashboard (EPA): DTXSID8048529
- ECHA InfoCard: 100.008.701

Chemical and physical data
- Formula: C_{11}H_{17}NO_{3}
- Molar mass: 211.261 g·mol^{−1}
- 3D model (JSmol): Interactive image
- Chirality: Racemic mixture
- Solubility in water: 9.7 mg/mL (20 °C)
- SMILES: Oc1cc(cc(O)c1)C(O)CNC(C)C
- InChI: InChI=1S/C11H17NO3/c1-7(2)12-6-11(15)8-3-9(13)5-10(14)4-8/h3-5,7,11-15H,6H2,1-2H3; Key:LMOINURANNBYCM-UHFFFAOYSA-N

Orciprenaline, also known as metaproterenol, is a bronchodilator used in the treatment of asthma. Orciprenaline is a moderately selective β_{2} adrenergic receptor agonist that stimulates receptors of the smooth muscle in the lungs, uterus, and vasculature supplying skeletal muscle, with minimal or no effect on α adrenergic receptors. The pharmacologic effects of β adrenergic agonist drugs, such as orciprenaline, are at least in part attributable to stimulation through β adrenergic receptors of intracellular adenylyl cyclase, the enzyme which catalyzes the conversion of ATP to cAMP. Increased cAMP levels are associated with relaxation of bronchial smooth muscle and inhibition of release of mediators of immediate hypersensitivity from many cells, especially from mast cells.

== Adverse effects ==
More common side effects of metaproterenol include tachycardia and nervousness. Additional side effects with >1% incidence include headache, nausea, and tremor. A non-exhaustive list of rare side effects includes other cardiovascular symptoms, dizziness, fatigue, etc.
