= Bitolterol =

Chemical compound

Clinical data
- Trade names: Tornalate
- AHFS/Drugs.com: Micromedex Detailed Consumer Information
- MedlinePlus: a601236
- ATC code: R03AC17 (WHO)

Legal status
- Legal status: US: Discontinued

Pharmacokinetic data
- Onset of action: 2–5 minutes
- Duration of action: 6–8 hours

Identifiers
- IUPAC name: (RS)-[4-(1-Hydroxy-2-tert-butylamino-ethyl)-2-(4-methylbenzoyl)oxy-phenyl] 4-methylbenzoate
- CAS Number: 30392-40-6; mesylate: 30392-41-7
- PubChem CID: 35330
- DrugBank: DB00901
- ChemSpider: 32525
- UNII: 9KY0QXD6LI; mesylate: 4E53T3611U
- KEGG: D07534; mesylate: D00684
- ChEMBL: ChEMBL1201295
- CompTox Dashboard (EPA): DTXSID1022683

Chemical and physical data
- Formula: C_{28}H_{31}NO_{5}
- Molar mass: 461.558 g·mol^{−1}
- 3D model (JSmol): Interactive image
- Chirality: Racemic mixture
- SMILES: O=C(Oc2cc(ccc2OC(=O)c1ccc(cc1)C)C(O)CNC(C)(C)C)c3ccc(cc3)C

Bitolterol mesylate, formerly sold under the brand name Tornalate, is a short-acting β_{2}-adrenergic receptor agonist used for the relief of bronchospasm in conditions such as asthma and chronic obstructive pulmonary disease (COPD). Bitolterol relaxes the smooth muscles present continuously around the bronchi and bronchioles facilitating the flow of air through them.

Colterol

Bitolterol is a prodrug of colterol. It has a rapid onset of action (2–5 minutes) and may last up to 6–8 hours. The drug, alone or in co-administration with theophylline, doesn't show cardiotoxic effect.

The US Food and Drug Administration (FDA) approved bitolterol in December 1984. The drug was withdrawn from the market by Élan Pharmaceuticals in 2001.
