= Zilpaterol =

Chemical compound

Clinical data
- Trade names: Zilmax
- Other names: RU 42173
- Routes of administration: Oral
- ATC code: None

Legal status
- Legal status: AU: S4 (Prescription only); CA: ℞-only

Pharmacokinetic data
- Elimination half-life: 11.9–13.2 hours (first phase)
- Excretion: Urine (88.2–84.3%) and feces (8.6–8.7%) (in cattle)

Identifiers
- IUPAC name: (±)-trans-4,5,6,7-Tetrahydro-7-hydroxy-6-(isopropylamino)-imidazo[4,5,1-jk]-[1]benzazepin-2(1H)-one
- CAS Number: 119520-05-7
- PubChem CID: 9992825
- DrugBank: DB11479
- ChemSpider: 2343170
- UNII: S384A1Y12J
- CompTox Dashboard (EPA): DTXSID50904261

Chemical and physical data
- Formula: C_{14}H_{19}N_{3}O_{2}
- Molar mass: 261.325 g·mol^{−1}
- 3D model (JSmol): Interactive image
- SMILES: CC(C)N[C@@H]1CCN2C3=C([C@H]1O)C=CC=C3NC2=O
- InChI: InChI=1S/C14H19N3O2/c1-8(2)15-11-6-7-17-12-9(13(11)18)4-3-5-10(12)16-14(17)19/h3-5,8,11,13,15,18H,6-7H2,1-2H3,(H,16,19)/t11-,13-/m1/s1; Key:ZSTCZWJCLIRCOJ-DGCLKSJQSA-N

Zilpaterol is a synthetic β_{2} adrenergic agonist. Under its brand name, Zilmax, it is used to increase the size of cattle and the efficiency of feeding them. Zilmax is produced by Intervet, a subsidiary of Merck & Co., and marketed as a "beef-improvement technology". Zilpaterol is typically fed in the last three to six weeks of cattle's lives, with a brief period (three days in the US) before death for withdrawal, which allows the drug to mostly leave the animal's tissues.

Concerns have been raised on the impact of zilpaterol on flavor; however, studies have confirmed that overall tenderness, juiciness, flavor intensity, and beef flavor remain within the normal variation observed in the beef industry and differences are smaller than what can be detected by the consumer. In the meantime, several studies have shown the use of zilpaterol leads to increased size, feed efficiency, and value.

Merck reported Zilmax-fed cattle do not produce beef with a difference in taste or quality compared to cattle not fed the drug, but elsewhere, concerns have been raised about the beef's tenderness. Studies have variously found a slight reduction in tenderness, an increase in shear force, and a lower percentage of intramuscular fat (marbling).

== Prohibitions and processor adoption ==
As of October 2017, Zilmax was approved in 17 countries, notably the US, Canada, South Africa, South Korea, Ukraine and Brazil.

As of 2013, Zilmax was banned in China, Taiwan, Russia, and many countries in the European Union.

=== In the US ===
Tyson Foods was the first among the largest U.S. meatpackers to adopt Zilmax. Because of concerns about tenderness and loss of marbling, Cargill and other meatpackers resisted the practice. The next adopters were JBS and National Beef, with Cargill finally joining them in mid-2012.

On August 6, 2013, Tyson Foods banned Zilmax-fed cattle from its processing plants after cattle began arriving with missing hooves in large numbers during hot weather.

== Origin and formulation ==
Zilmax is produced by Merck in France, a country in which the substance is prohibited. As of October 2017, its commercial formulation was 4.8% zilpaterol hydrochloride, 8% polyoxyl castor oil, 4.3% polyvinyl pyrrolidone and 82.9% ground corn cob.

== Chemistry ==
Zilpaterol has two chiral carbons and consequently four optical enantiomers. These enantiomers are: (6R,7R)-, (6R,7S)-, (6S,7R)- and (6S,7S)-. RU 42173 corresponds to racemic trans-zilpaterol hydrochloride, a mixture of the (6R,7R)-(−)- and (6S,7S)-(+)-enantiomers.
