= Indacaterol =

Chemical compound

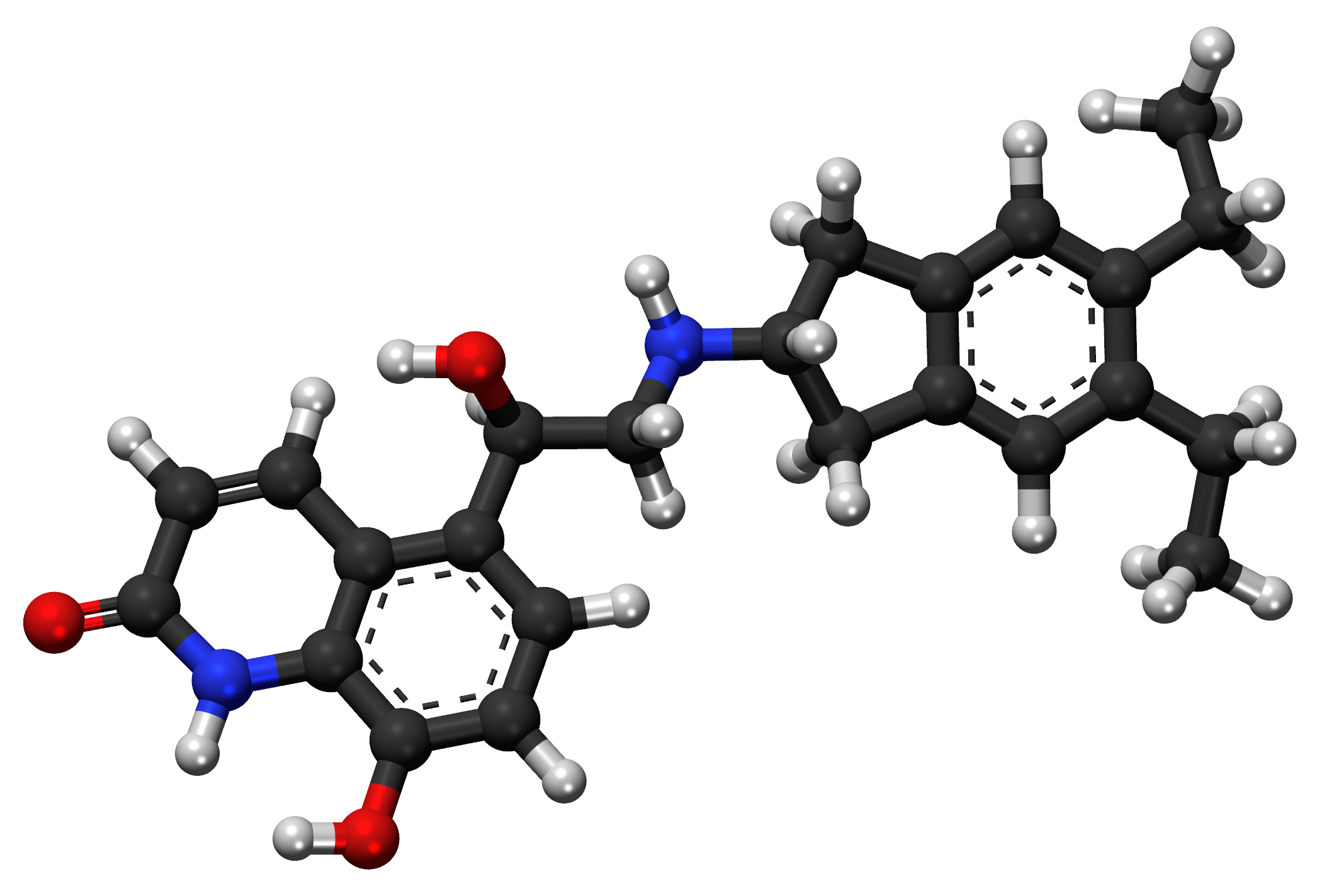

Clinical data
- Trade names: Onbrez, Arcapta
- AHFS/Drugs.com: International Drug Names
- License data: EU EMA: by INN; US DailyMed: Indacaterol
- Pregnancy category: AU: B3
- Routes of administration: Inhalation
- ATC code: R03AC18 (WHO)

Legal status
- Legal status: AU: S4 (Prescription only); UK: POM (Prescription only); US: ℞-only; EU: Rx-only

Pharmacokinetic data
- Bioavailability: 43-45 % (inhaled)
- Metabolism: UGT1A1, CYP3A4
- Elimination half-life: 40-56 h

Identifiers
- IUPAC name: 5-[2-[(5,6-Diethyl-2,3-dihydro-1H-inden-2-yl)amino]-1-hydroxyethyl]-8-hydroxyquinolin-2(1H)-one
- CAS Number: 312753-06-3
- PubChem CID: 6433117
- IUPHAR/BPS: 7455
- DrugBank: DB05039
- ChemSpider: 5293751
- UNII: 8OR09251MQ
- KEGG: D09318
- ChEBI: CHEBI:68575
- ChEMBL: ChEMBL1095777
- CompTox Dashboard (EPA): DTXSID90185198
- ECHA InfoCard: 100.218.577

Chemical and physical data
- Formula: C_{24}H_{28}N_{2}O_{3}
- Molar mass: 392.499 g·mol^{−1}
- 3D model (JSmol): Interactive image
- SMILES: O=C4/C=C\c1c(c(O)ccc1[C@@H](O)CNC3Cc2cc(c(cc2C3)CC)CC)N4
- InChI: InChI=1S/C24H28N2O3/c1-3-14-9-16-11-18(12-17(16)10-15(14)4-2)25-13-22(28)19-5-7-21(27)24-20(19)6-8-23(29)26-24/h5-10,18,22,25,27-28H,3-4,11-13H2,1-2H3,(H,26,29)/t22-/m0/s1; Key:QZZUEBNBZAPZLX-QFIPXVFZSA-N

Indacaterol is an ultra-long-acting beta-adrenoceptor agonist developed by Novartis. It needs to be taken only once a day, unlike the related drugs formoterol and salmeterol. It is licensed only for the treatment of chronic obstructive pulmonary disease (COPD) (long-term data in patients with asthma are thus far lacking). It is delivered through a dry powder inhaler.

== Medical uses ==
A Cochrane review found benefit in lung function in people with COPD at least as good as that seen with twice-daily long-acting beta2-agonists.

== Pharmacology ==
=== Pharmacodynamics ===
Indacaterol activities
Receptor	K_{i} (nM)	EC_{50} (nM)	E_{max} (%)^{a}
β_{1}	617	251	16%^{a}
β_{2}	43.7	8.71	73%^{a}
β_{3}	3,310	191	113%^{a}
Footnotes: ^{a} = Compared to isoprenaline (isoproterenol). Refs:

Indacaterol is a long-acting selective β_{2}-adrenergic receptor agonist.

== History ==
It was approved by the European Medicines Agency (EMA) under the brand name Onbrez Breezhaler on November 30, 2009, and by the United States Food and Drug Administration (FDA), under the brand name Arcapta Neohaler, on July 1, 2011. In 2016, Novartis licensed its U.S. commercial rights for Arcapta Neohaler to Sunovion Pharmaceuticals.

== See also ==
- Substituted 2-aminoindane
