= Exosite =

An exosite is a secondary binding site, remote from the active site, on an enzyme or other protein.

This is similar to allosteric sites, but differs in the fact that, in order for an enzyme to be active, its exosite typically must be occupied. Exosites have recently become a topic of increased interest in biomedical research as potential drug targets.

== Introduction ==
Exosites are an alternative binding site on an enzyme that can trigger changes in the protein. They have multiple uses for an enzyme, such as substrate-recognition, inhibitor-binding, cofactor-binding, and others, depending on the physiological needs. An enzyme having this alternative binding region can help the positioning and recognition of substrates. They can also hold substrates in place to perform reactions at the active site. If an enzyme needs to cleave the protein at its activation region, the substrate could first attach to an exosite in order to properly position it and keep it attached in order to ensure the reaction. Exosites are commonly seen in thrombin since they help improve the specificity and efficiency of blood clotting reactions and immune responses.

== Structure ==
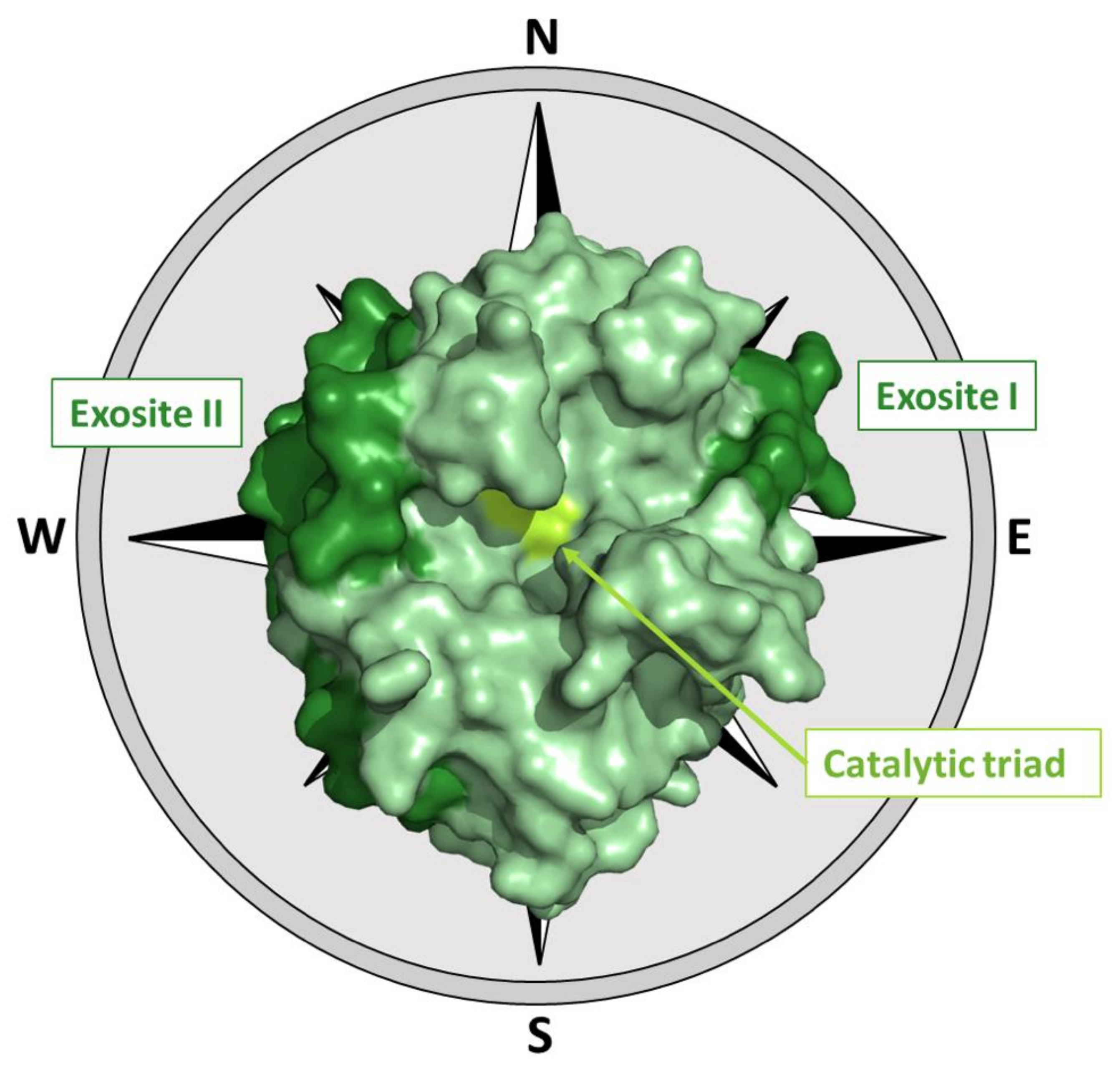
Figure 1: Structure of a thrombin molecule with exosite I and exosite II oriented at the northeastern region and western region, respectively.

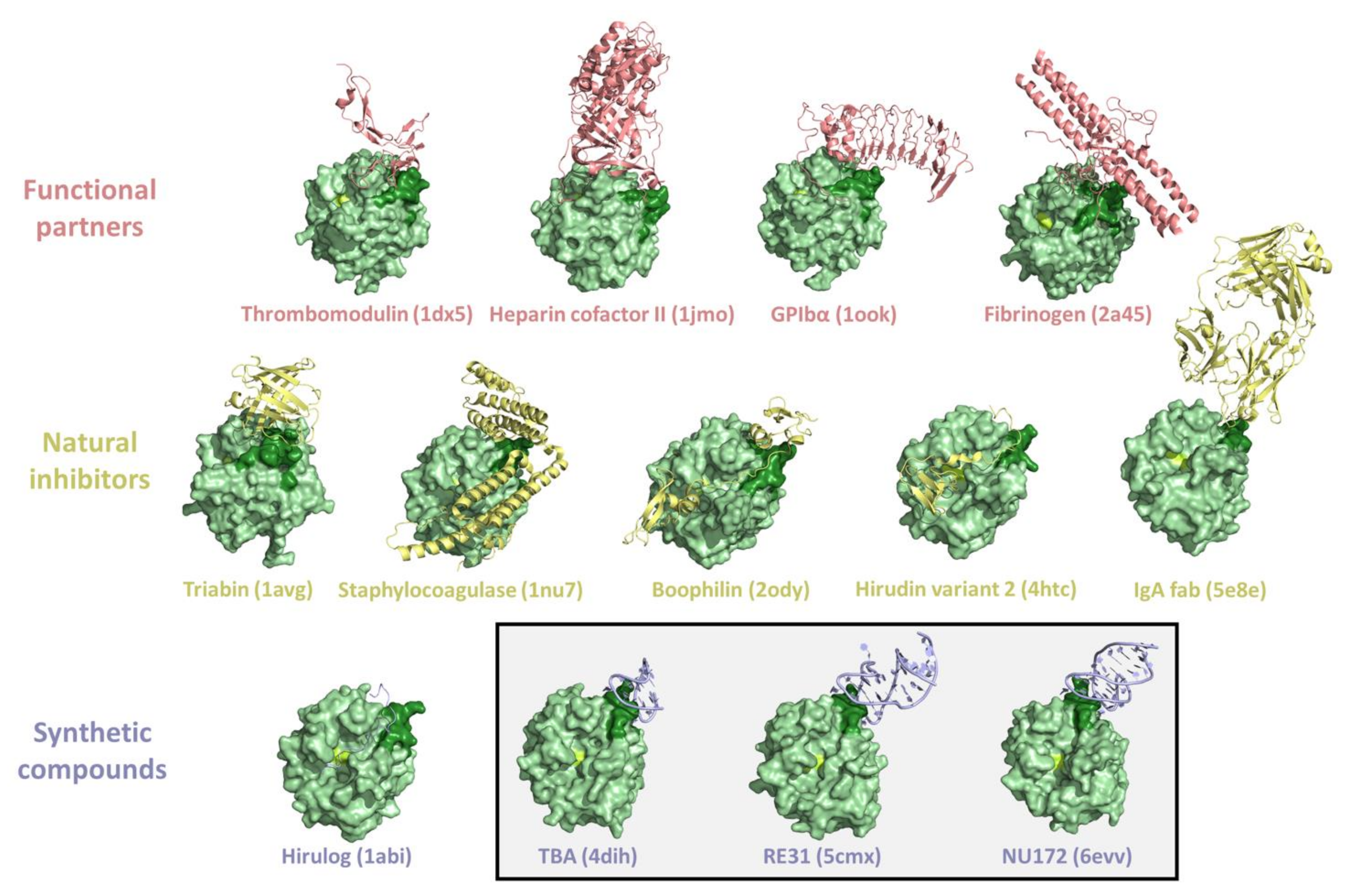
Figure 2: Exosite I on a thrombin and the different molecules that can attach.

The structure of exosites is heavily researched in thrombin and other proteinases. In these proteinases, there are two defined exosites attached to the surface at catalytic domains. These exosites are separated physically from the catalytic site and are positively charged in thrombin. Figure 1 denotes the arrangement of exosite I and II on the thrombin surface, with them located at the northeast and west of the active site. Exosites I and II are the two different types of exosites and can structurally arrange in many different overlapping ways. These orientations allow for many different ligands to bind to the molecule. Exosite I and II are electropositive and help recognize macromolecular substrates, effectors, and inhibitors. Exosite I is composed of insertion loops 30-40 and 70-80, with the values indicating amino acid length. Upon complex formation, the 70-80 loop of exosite I undergoes changes thermodynamically. This exosite has an affinity for negatively charged ligands, meaning it will tightly bind to these. Figure 2 shows the different molecules that can bind to exosite I. Exosite II is composed of positively charged clusters of residue. In exosite I, interactions structurally have more hydrophobic interactions, and exosite II has electrostatic interactions. Location and configuration of exosite II is crucial. This exosite has a glycine residue, this makes the exosite II be more flexible which as seen in the research is important to escort the elastin to the catalytic site for hydrolysis. Exosites can also be produced from the spatial clustering of catalytic residues of similar properties in Pl molecules. These are stabilized by bacterial cofactors. They can also temporarily occupy plasmin and alter its specificity; but not permanent structural pockets like in thrombin.

== Function ==
For protease exosites, there are three functions: substrate recognition, inhibitor binding, or cofactor binding. Exosites work in thrombin to recognize substrates and inhibitors. To initialize these functions, exosites flank the active site and promote binding of substrates, cofactors, and inhibitors, stabilizing enzyme-ligand complexes. This process regulates thrombin activity through allosteric effects. In the binding of substrates, exosites help position the substrate onto the catalyst, which increases specificity and efficiency. The binding of cofactors at exosites improves enzyme function by enhancing the interactions with substrates. In the binding of inhibitors, exosites create docking regions that accelerate the binding of inhibitors to thrombin or other enzymes.

Exosites use the active site for inhibitor binding and cofactor binding, but for substrate recognition, exosites impact protease function without active site binding. The active site only recognizes small peptide sequences. This limits specificity, since some proteases need their target protein to unfold in order to cleave substrates. When interacting with extended regions of substrates, it allows for broader specificity and for exosites to bind to different kinds of substrates. Thrombin is an example of a protease that has a broad specificity, and exosite binding to its substrates allows it to overcome the limitations of its active sites. In thrombin, antithrombin, and other inhibitors inhibit blood coagulation, so the ability to cleave substrates allows these inhibitors to be blocked. However, antithrombin has evolved to inhibit coagulation factors that could not be blocked by binding to substrates.

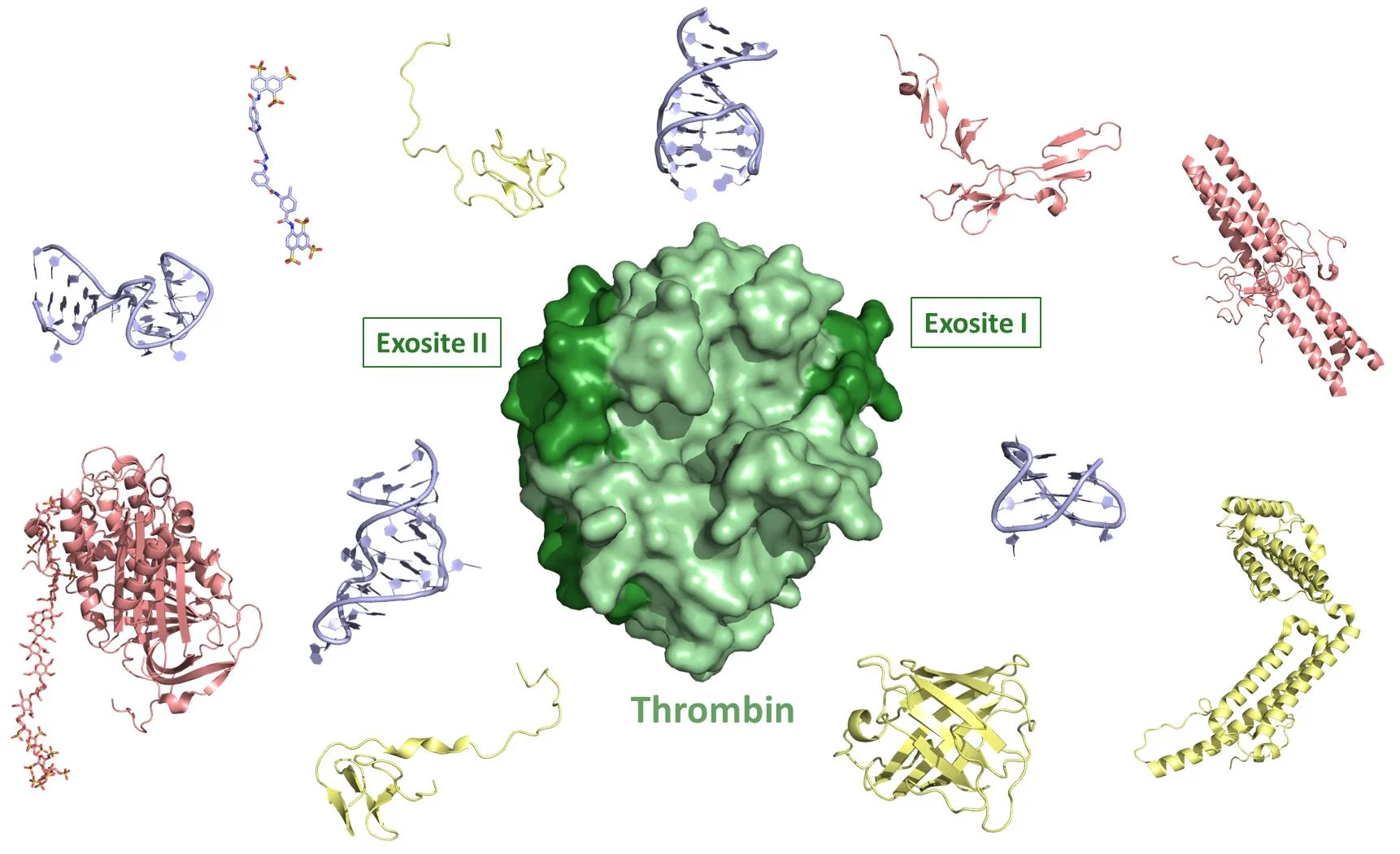
Figure 3: The location of exosite I and II on thrombin.

Figure 3 below shows exosite I and exosite II and their locations on thrombin. Exosite I primarily is a fibrinogen-binding site, and exosite II is a heparin-binding site. Studies have shown that exosites are not just rigid binding regions, but they are highly flexible surfaces that can adapt to different ligands. Exosite I and II also communicate with each other. There is long-range inter-exosite communication that creates dynamic transmissions of the structural information from one exosite to another. This exosite communication helps thrombin interact with multiple partners simultaneously during coagulation.

These partners that thrombin communicates with include substrates, inhibitors, and ligands, as mentioned above. These ligands include proteins, peptides, and nucleic acid aptamers. The aptamers bind to specific targets, and they are single-stranded DNA or RNA molecules. Aptamers can bind to thrombin. Two examples of an aptamer are TBA (a DNA aptamer) and Toggle-25t (an RNA aptamer). TBA binds to thrombin via exosite I, and Toggle-25t binds to thrombin via exosite II. Studies on aptamers found that binding at exosite I or II can affect thrombin activity without directly blocking the active site of thrombin. This shows that exosites can fine-tune enzyme function through indirect mechanisms.

In regard to docking regions on exosites, an example of this is the prothrombin docking to various exosites. This process involves two steps and leads to thrombin formation. The first step involves the docking of prothrombin FXa-Va membrane on exosites. FXa (factor XA) is an enzyme, and FVa (factor Va) is a cofactor that binds to the catalytic site of FXa. The docking of prothrombin forms a complex. On this complex, the active site of FXa is accessible to substrates and inhibitors. The FXa-Va membrane complex is also known as the prothrombinase complex. When this happens, the FXa catalytic site gets ready for prothrombin cleavage due to a conformational change. The second step is this conformational change, which results in prothrombin activation, and the prothrombin competes with other substrates to bind to the same exosite on prothrombinase. When prothrombinase is catalyzed by prothrombin, thrombin is produced.

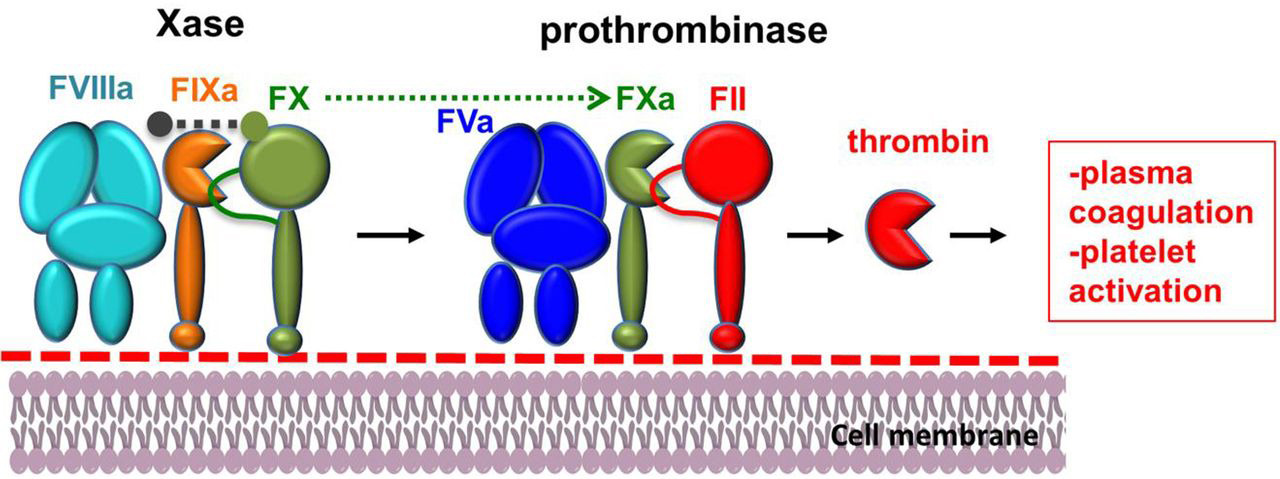
Figure 4: The synthesis of thrombin.

Figure 4 below shows how thrombin is produced: the green dashed line represents exosite involvement in generating FXa, ultimately leading to the formation of the prothrombinase complex and production of thrombin. The involvement of exosite in blood coagulation is described in the exosite application section.

== Uses/Applications ==
=== Cathepsin V ===
One example of exosites applications is in Cathepsin V. Cathepsin V is an elastase involved in extracellular matrix degradation; this cathepsin is very effective. It was found that the structurally homologous cathepsin L, which shares a 78% amino acid sequence, has only a minimal proteolatic activity toward insoluble elastin. This study then suggests there are distinct domains between both of them. It was found that there are two exosites that contribute to cathepsin V elastolytic activity effectiveness. These exosites are located in the surface loop regions. In the study the replacement of exosite I or II with analogous residues from cathepsin L led to 75% loss in elastolytic activity for exosite I and 43% loss for exosite II, when both exosites were replaced it led to a non-elastase variant, similar to cathepsin L. It was found that the hydrophobicity of both exosites increase when going from the appropriate sequences present in cathepsin L to cathepsin V, indicating that hydrophobicity of both exosites is a critical matter for the elastolytic activity that cathepsin V.

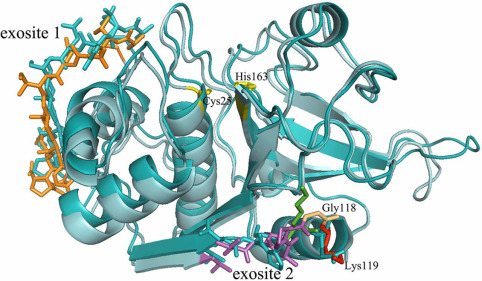
Figure 5: Cathepsin V (light blue), exosite I (orange), exosite 2 (purple), and Capthespin V (dark blue)

On figure 5 Cathepsin V is colored in lighter blue with exosite I colored in orange and exosite II in purple. Cathepsin L is colored in darker blue with its exosite analogous. Active site residues Cys25 and His163 are colored in yellow.

Both exosites contribute to 85% of elastolytic activity in cathepsin V implying a cooperative mode of enzyme-substrate interaction. In the study they found that deprivation of exosite I causes a more severe reduction of elastolytic activity for cathepsin V. They assume then that exosite I is the one that provides the initial contact site to elastin, which then leads to the interaction with exosite II. After these two exosites rebound to elastin they maneuver susceptible peptide bonds into the active site, both exosites and active cleft then form a triangular arrangement on the surface of cathepsin V and then act as a “docking station for elastin”

=== Blood coagulation ===
Exosites allow for regulated inhibition in certain conditions such as blood coagulation and immune responses. Blood coagulation depends highly on Xase and prothrombinase complexes. They are highly used with Xase, a multi-protein enzyme complex, which activates coagulation factor X and converts it to factor Xa. This substrate affinity is enforced by an initial interaction between factor X and enzyme complexes at exosites; they contribute to the stabilization, specificity, and regulation of the interaction between serpins and their target proteases.

Exosites can be used to develop more effective therapeutic applications but there still needs to exist a deeper understanding of how to harness exosites.

=== Matrix Metalloproteinase ===
The development of matrix metalloproteinase (MMP) inhibitors has been unsuccessful due to a lack of specificity and off-target effects. This is due to enzyme active sites possessing similar chemistry and configuration of varying MMPs. Recently inhibitor design has considered secondary binding sites, exosites, in order to improve specificity. Small molecules were developed that bind exosites in the catalytic domain. This has yielded inhibitors with desirable selectivities within the MMP family. Additionally, the incorporation of a zinc binding molecule that maintains a triple-helical construct allows for interaction with the active site and exosites adding sequence diversity and eliminating off target interactions.

=== Plasminogen ===
Plasminogen activation is largely regulated and driven by exosites rather than catalytic sites alone. Plasminogen possesses a closed conformation that limits access to its activation site, making activation into plasmin extremely hard without additional interactions. Plasminogen has kringle domains that are classic exosite-binding regions that allow it to bind to cofactors. These cofactors promote confirmation changes that enhance activation. Exosites are crucial as they act as the main binding site for these cofactors distinct from the active site and induce the conformational change. The binded cofactors enhance substrate affinity and specificity by stabilizing the form of plasminogen and catalyzing the conversion to plasmin.

=== Future Applications ===
A new strategy to drug enzymes is being developed. Usually drugs block the active sites which cleave or phosphorylate a peptide or substrate. These drugs sometimes are unable to block the active site.

Some pharmaceuticals are currently working on making drugs that block the exosite instead of the active site, hoping that the drugs are more selective and have fewer side effects.
