= Arformoterol =

Chemical compound

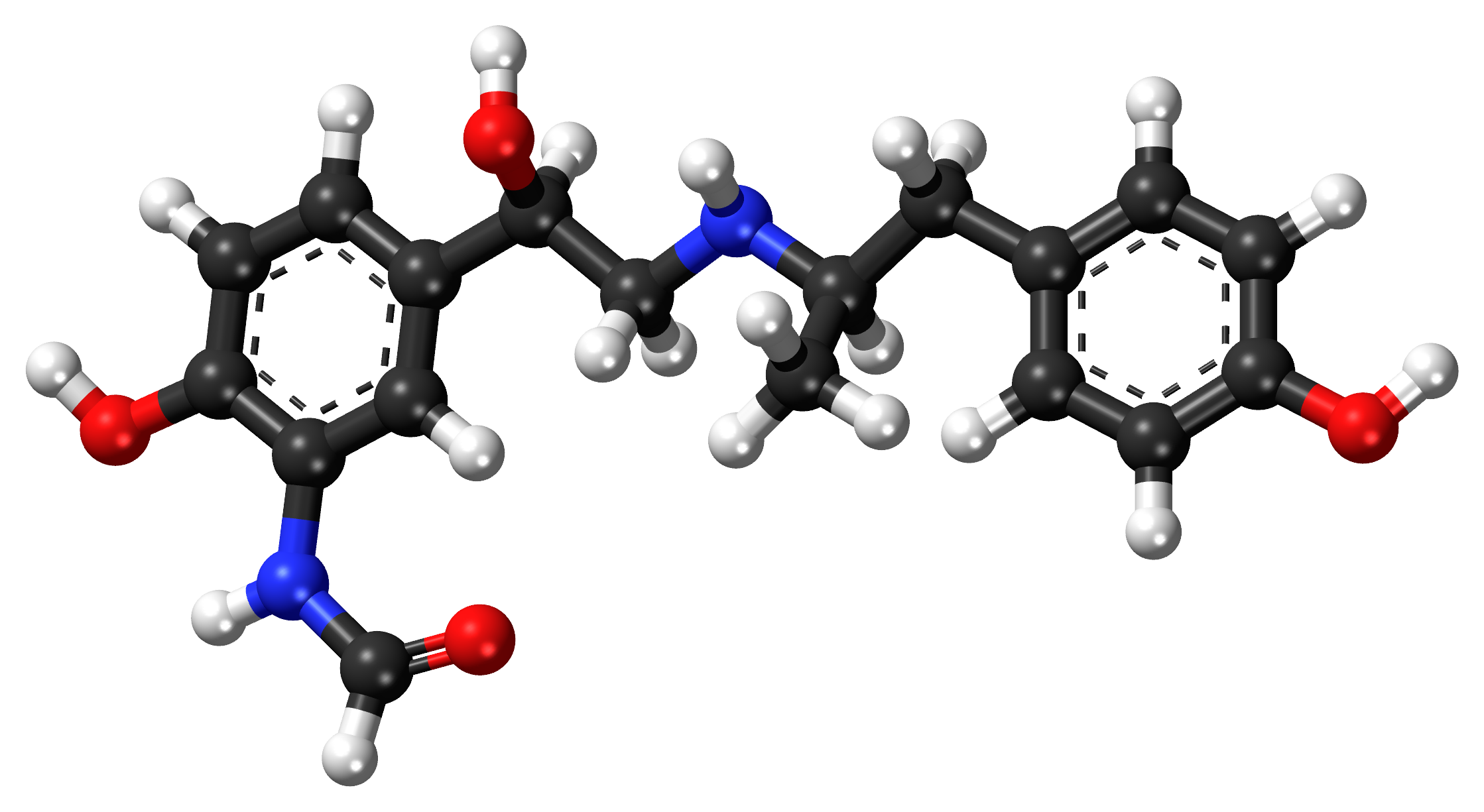

Clinical data
- Trade names: Brovana
- Other names: Arformoterol tartrate (USAN US)
- AHFS/Drugs.com: Monograph
- MedlinePlus: a602023
- License data: US DailyMed: Arformoterol
- Routes of administration: Inhalation
- ATC code: None

Legal status
- Legal status: US: ℞-only

Pharmacokinetic data
- Protein binding: 52–65%
- Elimination half-life: 26 hours

Identifiers
- IUPAC name: N-[2-hydroxy-5-[(1R)-1-hydroxy-2-[[(2R)-1-(4-methoxyphenyl) propan-2-yl]amino]ethyl] phenyl]formamide
- CAS Number: 67346-49-0
- PubChem CID: 3083544
- IUPHAR/BPS: 7479
- DrugBank: DB01274
- ChemSpider: 2340731
- UNII: F91H02EBWT
- KEGG: D07463; D02981
- ChEBI: CHEBI:408174
- ChEMBL: ChEMBL1201137
- CompTox Dashboard (EPA): DTXSID1023077 DTXSID40110071, DTXSID1023077

Chemical and physical data
- Formula: C_{19}H_{24}N_{2}O_{4}
- Molar mass: 344.411 g·mol^{−1}
- InChI: InChI=1S/C19H24N2O4/c1-13(9-14-3-6-16(25-2)7-4-14)20-11-19(24)15-5-8-18(23)17(10-15)21-12-22/h3-8,10,12-13,19-20,23-24H,9,11H2,1-2H3,(H,21,22)/t13-,19+/m1/s1; Key:BPZSYCZIITTYBL-YJYMSZOUSA-N

Arformoterol, sold under the brand name Brovana among others, is a medication used for the treatment of chronic obstructive pulmonary disease (COPD).

It is a long-acting β_{2} adrenoreceptor agonist (LABA) and it is the active (R,R)-(−)-enantiomer of formoterol. It was approved for medical use in the United States in October 2006. It is available as a generic medication.

== Medical uses ==
Arformoterol is indicated for the maintenance treatment of bronchoconstriction in people with chronic obstructive pulmonary disease (COPD).
