= Bambuterol =

Chemical compound

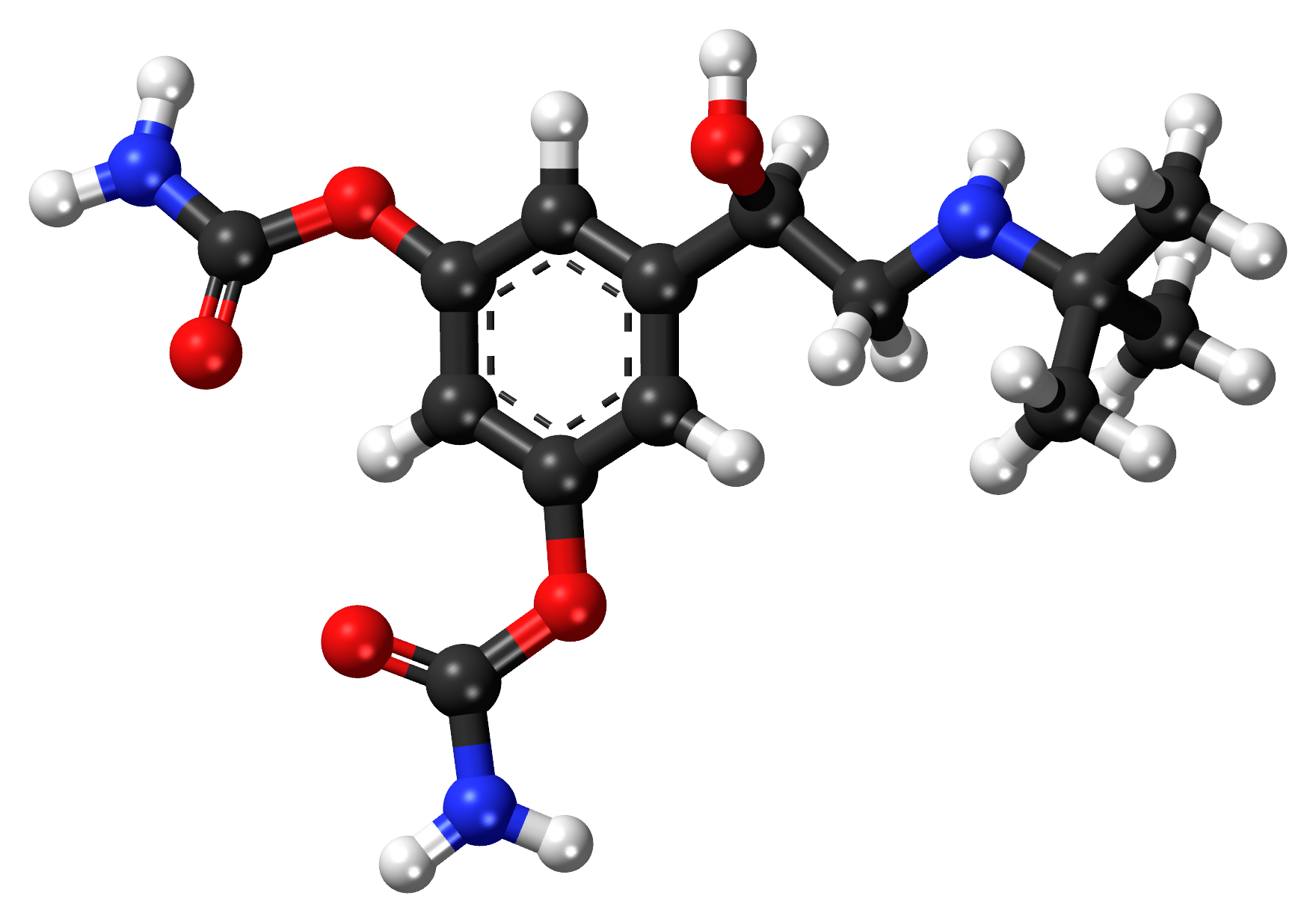
- Bambuterol (top), and (R)-bambuterol (bottom)

Clinical data
- AHFS/Drugs.com: International Drug Names
- Pregnancy category: Unknown
- Routes of administration: Oral (tablets)
- ATC code: R03CC12 (WHO)

Legal status
- Legal status: AU: S4 (Prescription only); In general: ℞ (Prescription only)

Pharmacokinetic data
- Bioavailability: 20%
- Metabolism: Extensive hepatic. Further metabolized to terbutaline by plasma cholinesterase
- Elimination half-life: 13 hours (bambuterol); 21 hours (terbutaline)
- Excretion: Renal

Identifiers
- IUPAC name: (RS)-5-[2-(tert-butylamino)-1-hydroxyethyl]benzene-1,3-diyl bis(dimethylcarbamate)
- CAS Number: 81732-65-2; HCl: 81732-46-9
- PubChem CID: 54766
- IUPHAR/BPS: 6601
- DrugBank: DB01408
- ChemSpider: 49466
- UNII: Y1850G1OVC; HCl: 786Q84QZ3F
- KEGG: D07377
- ChEBI: CHEBI:553827
- ChEMBL: ChEMBL521589
- CompTox Dashboard (EPA): DTXSID5048550

Chemical and physical data
- Formula: C_{18}H_{29}N_{3}O_{5}
- Molar mass: 367.446 g·mol^{−1}
- 3D model (JSmol): Interactive image
- Chirality: Racemic mixture
- SMILES: O=C(Oc1cc(cc(OC(=O)N(C)C)c1)C(O)CNC(C)(C)C)N(C)C
- InChI: InChI=1S/C18H29N3O5/c1-18(2,3)19-11-15(22)12-8-13(25-16(23)20(4)5)10-14(9-12)26-17(24)21(6)7/h8-10,15,19,22H,11H2,1-7H3; Key:ANZXOIAKUNOVQU-UHFFFAOYSA-N

Bambuterol (INN) is a long-acting β adrenoceptor agonist (LABA) used in the treatment of asthma; it also is a prodrug of terbutaline. Commercially, the AstraZeneca pharmaceutical company produces and markets bambuterol as Bambec and Oxeol.

It is not available in the U.S.

== Indications ==
As other LABAs, bambuterol is used in the long-term management of persistent asthma. It should not be used as a rescue medication for short-term relief of asthma symptoms.

=== Contraindications ===
Bambuterol is contraindicated in pregnancy and in people with seriously impaired liver function. It can be used by people with renal impairment, but dose adjustments are necessary.

== Adverse effects ==
The adverse effect profile of bambuterol is similar to that of salbutamol, and may include fatigue, nausea, palpitations, headache, dizziness and tremor.

== Interactions ==
Concomitant administration of bambuterol with corticosteroids, diuretics, and xanthine derivatives (such as theophylline) increases the risk of hypokalemia (decreased levels of potassium in the blood).

Bambuterol acts as a cholinesterase inhibitor, and can prolong the duration of action of suxamethonium (succinylcholine) and other drugs whose breakdown in the body depends on cholinesterase function. Butyrylcholinesterase activity returns to normal approximately two weeks after bambuterol is stopped. It can also enhance the effects of non-depolarizing neuromuscular blockers, such as vecuronium bromide.

== Synthesis ==
Thieme ChemDrug Synthesis: Patent: Korean: Sino: Asymmetric:

The reaction between 3',5'-Dihydroxyacetophenone [51863-60-6] (1) and Dimethylcarbamoyl chloride [79-44-7] (2) gives 5-Acetyl-1,3-phenylene bis(dimethylcarbamate) [81732-48-1] (3). Halogenation with bromine led to 5-(Bromoacetyl)-1,3-phenylene bis(dimethylcarbamate) [81732-49-2] (4). Treatment with N-(tert-Butyl)benzylamine [3378-72-1] (5) afforded [81732-47-0] (6). Catalytic hydrogenation completed the synthesis of bambuterol (7).
