= Salmeterol =

Chemical compound

- Skeletal formula of salmeterol

- Ball-and-stick model of salmeterol

Clinical data
- Trade names: Serevent, Aeromax, Qitai, Seretide, others
- AHFS/Drugs.com: Monograph
- License data: EU EMA: by INN; US DailyMed: Salmeterol
- Pregnancy category: AU: B3
- Routes of administration: Inhalation
- ATC code: R03AC12 (WHO)

Legal status
- Legal status: AU: S4 (Prescription only); CA: ℞-only; UK: POM (Prescription only); US: ℞-only; In general: ℞ (Prescription only)

Pharmacokinetic data
- Protein binding: 96%
- Metabolism: Liver (CYP3A4)
- Elimination half-life: 5.5 hours

Identifiers
- IUPAC name: (RS)-2-(hydroxymethyl)-4-{1-hydroxy-2-[6-(4-phenylbutoxy)hexylamino]ethyl}phenol
- CAS Number: 89365-50-4
- PubChem CID: 5152
- IUPHAR/BPS: 559
- DrugBank: DB00938
- ChemSpider: 7987886
- UNII: 2I4BC502BT
- KEGG: D05792
- ChEBI: CHEBI:9011
- ChEMBL: ChEMBL1263
- PDB ligand: K5Y (PDBe, RCSB PDB)
- CompTox Dashboard (EPA): DTXSID6023571
- ECHA InfoCard: 100.122.879

Chemical and physical data
- Formula: C_{25}H_{37}NO_{4}
- Molar mass: 415.574 g·mol^{−1}
- 3D model (JSmol): Interactive image
- Chirality: Racemic mixture
- SMILES: OCc1cc(ccc1O)[C@H](O)CNCCCCCCOCCCCc2ccccc2
- InChI: InChI=1S/C25H37NO4/c27-20-23-18-22(13-14-24(23)28)25(29)19-26-15-7-1-2-8-16-30-17-9-6-12-21-10-4-3-5-11-21/h3-5,10-11,13-14,18,25-29H,1-2,6-9,12,15-17,19-20H2/t25-/m1/s1; Key:GIIZNNXWQWCKIB-RUZDIDTESA-N

Salmeterol is a long-acting β_{2} adrenergic receptor agonist (LABA) used in the treatment and prevention of asthma symptoms and control of chronic obstructive pulmonary disease (COPD) symptoms. Symptoms of bronchospasm include shortness of breath, wheezing, coughing and chest tightness. It is also used to prevent breathing difficulties during exercise (exercise-induced bronchoconstriction).

It was patented in 1983 and came into medical use in 1990. It is marketed as Serevent in the US. It is available as a dry-powder inhaler (DPI) that releases a powdered form of the drug. It was previously available as a metered-dose inhaler (MDI) but was discontinued in the US in 2002. It is available as an MDI in other countries as of 2020.

== Mechanism of action ==
Inhaled salmeterol belongs to a group of drugs called beta-2 agonists. These drugs stimulate beta-2 receptors present in the bronchial musculature. This causes them to relax and prevent the onset and worsening of symptoms of asthma. They act on the enzyme adenyl cyclase which increases the concentration of cAMP (Cyclic adenosine monophosphate). This cyclic AMP decreases the smooth muscle tone. This drug is 10,000-times more lipid soluble than the short acting beta-2 adrenoceptor agonist, albuterol. Unlike albuterol, salmeterol becomes dissolved in the lipid bilayer of the cell membrane, and its gradual dissociation from the cell membrane provides beta-2 adrenoceptors with a supply of agonist for an extended period of time.

The primary noticeable difference of salmeterol from salbutamol, and other short-acting β_{2} adrenoreceptor agonists (SABAs), is its duration of action. Salmeterol lasts approximately 12 hours in comparison with salbutamol, which lasts about 4–6 hours. When used regularly every day as prescribed, inhaled salmeterol decreases the number and severity of asthma attacks. Formoterol has been demonstrated to have a faster onset of action than salmeterol as a result of a lower lipophilicity, and has also been demonstrated to be more potent—a 12 μg dose of formoterol has been demonstrated to be equivalent to a 50 μg dose of salmeterol.

== Medical uses ==
- Salmeterol is used in moderate-to-severe persistent asthma following previous treatment with a short-acting β_{2} adrenoreceptor agonist (SABA) such as salbutamol (albuterol).
- LABAs should not be used as a monotherapy, instead, they should be used concurrently with an inhaled corticosteroid, such as beclometasone dipropionate or fluticasone propionate in the treatment of asthma to minimize serious reactions such as asthma-related deaths. Combination of inhaled corticosteroids and salmeterol (LABA) has synergistic action and reduces the frequency of asthma attacks and also makes it less severe.
- In chronic obstructive pulmonary disease (COPD), LABAs may be used as monotherapy or in combination with corticosteroids. The Torch study demonstrated benefits in terms of quality of life and lung function of salmeterol alone or in combination with inhaled corticosteroids in patients with COPD
- In exercise-induced bronchospasm monotherapy may be indicated in patients without persistent asthma. LABAs should not be used to treat acute symptoms.

=== Pregnancy and lactation ===
Salmeterol use during pregnancy must be decided based on the risks versus benefits to the mother. There are no well-controlled studies with salmeterol in pregnant women. Some animal studies showed developmental malformation when the mother was given several clinical doses orally. In rats, salmeterol xinafoate is excreted in the milk. However, since there is no data to show excretion of salmeterol in a mother's breast milk, a decision on whether to continue or discontinue therapy should be decided based on the important benefits it provides to the mother. Pregnant and lactating women should consult their doctors before using salmeterol.

== Side effects ==
Due to its vasodilation properties, the common side effects of salmeterol are

- dizziness,
- sinus infection, and
- migraine headaches.

Other side effects

- muscle tremors,
- hypokalemia due to direct effect on beta-2 receptors on skeletal muscle.

In most cases, salmeterol side effects are minor and either do not require treatment or can easily be treated. Certain side effects, however, should be reported to a healthcare provider immediately.

Some of these more serious side effects include

- very fast heart rate,
- high blood pressure, and
- worsening breathing problems.

== Structure-activity relationship ==
Salmeterol has an aryl alkyl group with a chain length of 11 atoms from the amine. This bulkiness makes the compound more lipophilic and it also makes it selective to β_{2} adrenergic receptors.

== History ==
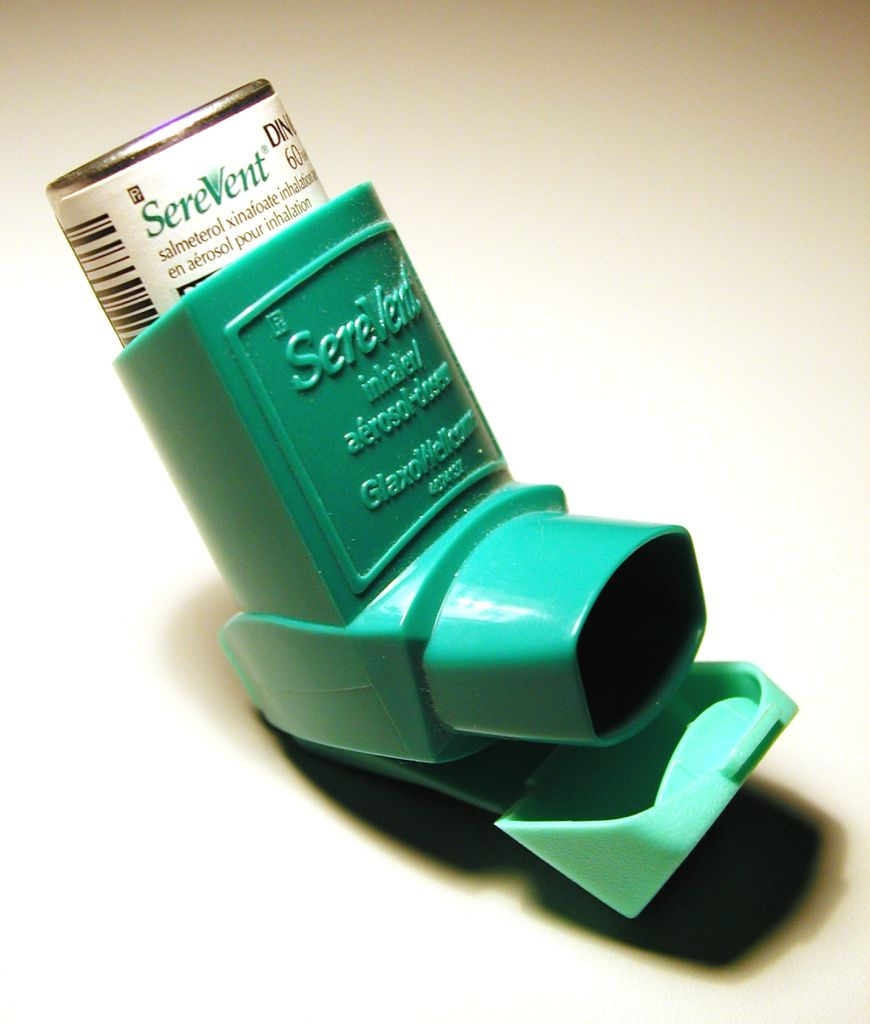
Previously used metered-dose inhaler of Serevent-brand salmeterol

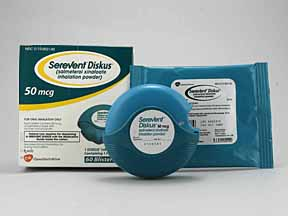
A typical dry-powder inhaler salmeterol "diskus"

Salmeterol, first marketed and manufactured by Glaxo (now GlaxoSmithKline, GSK) in the 1980s, was released as Serevent in 1990. The product is marketed by GSK under the Allen & Hanburys brand in the UK.

In November 2005, the US Food and Drug Administration (FDA) released a health advisory, alerting the public to findings that show the use of long-acting β_{2} agonists could lead to a worsening of symptoms, and in some cases death.

While the use of inhaled LABAs are still recommended in asthma guidelines for the resulting improved symptom control, further concerns have been raised. A large meta-analysis of pooled results from 19 trials with 33,826 participants, suggests that salmeterol may increase the small risks of asthma-related deaths, and this additional risk is not reduced with the additional use of inhaled steroids (e.g., as with the combination product fluticasone/salmeterol). This seems to occur because although LABAs relieve asthma symptoms, they also promote bronchial inflammation and sensitivity without warning.

== Society and culture ==
=== Names ===
Combinations of inhaled steroids and these long-acting bronchodilators are becoming more widespread; the most common combination currently in use is fluticasone/salmeterol (brand names Seretide (UK) and Advair (US)). Another combination is budesonide/formoterol (brand name Symbicort).
