= Commonly prescribed drugs =

Type of drugs

Commonly prescribed drugs are drugs that are frequently provided by doctors in a prescription to treat a certain disease. These drugs are often first-line treatment for the target diseases and are effective in tackling the symptoms. An example of the target disease is ischemic heart disease. Some examples of commonly prescribed drugs for this disease are beta-blockers, calcium-channel blockers and nitrates.

In accordance with the pharmacological effects, commonly prescribed drugs can be divided into different groups. Drugs in the same group exert nearly identical effects, and can be utilized for treating the prevailing disease and sometimes, preventing complications of the existing diseases.

The use of commonly prescribed drugs can be reflected from the number of prescriptions of the drugs. Countries have their own dataset in recording the trend of commonly prescribed drugs. For example, the United States uses the Medical Expenditure Panel Survey (MEPS) and England uses the English Prescribing Dataset to record the prescription data for showing which drugs are commonly prescribed.

Understanding commonly prescribed drugs allows healthcare professionals to react to symptoms quickly and new treatment strategies can be developed. However, the data for commonly prescribed drugs may be outdated due to the time lag between data collection and publication as well as errors in data collection process.

== History ==
Commonly prescribed drugs are prescribed according to guidelines around the world. For instance, for ischemic heart disease, the American College of Cardiology/American Heart Association (ACC/AHA) guideline is used in the United States and the European Society of Cardiology (ESC) guideline is used in Europe. Western guidelines are more commonly used for reference during the development of local practice guidelines due to the large number of western guidelines stored in guideline databases. The data of prescriptions are collected through the government, such as Medical Expenditure Panel Survey (MEPS) in America and the Pharmaceutical Benefit Scheme (PBS) in Australia, providing information on the actual prescription volume of drugs.

=== The United States ===
The Medical Expenditure Panel Survey (MEPS) conducted by the Agency for Healthcare Research and Quality (AHRQ) via the United States government is used to collect prescription data and data for other healthcare services, including home healthcare, children's health and preventive care in America. The survey started in 1996 and was the predecessor of the National Medical Expenditure Survey (NMES) and the National Medical Care Utilization and Expenditure Survey (NMCUES), which were conducted in 1977 (NMES-1), 1980 (NMCUES), and 1987 (NMES-2). The survey is updated every year with the renewed data from the country. The prescription data is published in the Prescribed Medicines File of the MEPS. The collection of data involves two components: Household component and the Medical Provider component. The household component collects self-reported data of the prescribed medicines and the demographic information of the respondents. The Medical Provider component acts as a piece of follow-back information provided by the pharmacy including a computerized printout for all prescription filled for the patient.

=== The United Kingdom ===
The English Prescribing Dataset (EPD) from the NHS Business Services Authority (NHSBSA) provides prescription data in the United Kingdom. The dataset was created in 2014. EPD is a combination of the Detailed Prescribing Information (DPI) and the Practice Level Prescribing in England (PLP). Both DPI and PLP are previous datasets from NHSBSA and NHS Digital respectively and EPD aims to replace them both in the future, but no specific date of replacement is given. EPD collects data from England, Wales, Scotland, Guernsey, Alderney, Jersey and the Isle of Man. EPD provides the item, quantity, net ingredient cost, actual cost, average daily quantity (ADQ), practice name and address details of the prescription.

=== Australia ===
The Pharmaceutical Benefits Scheme (PBS) from the Australian Government Department of Health provides the prescription data of prescriptions under PBS. PBS started in 1948 and the under co-payment prescriptions were added into the dataset from 1 April 2012. It publishes the PBS expenditure and prescriptions report every year recording prescription data in the past 12 months. The examples of data it provides are the top 50 drugs by total prescription volume and the top 50 drugs by government cost.

== Benefits and limitations ==
=== Benefits ===
Understanding commonly prescribed drugs for different diseases can allow healthcare professionals to be more confident and decisive when choosing the most suitable treatment for the patient. This can also help develop new treatment strategies by researchers for more effective treatments. By enriching the knowledge of commonly prescribed drugs, pharmacy students will be more familiar with their mechanism of action, first-line therapy indications and side effects.

=== Limitations ===
Limitations include time lag for the conducted survey. The Medical Expenditure Panel Survey (MEPS) shows data recorded two years before the publishing of the survey. The time lag may lead to a difference in representing the current prescribing practice with the recorded data in the survey. Questionnaires which are self-reported tend to create recall bias. Respondents are likely to underreport the number of prescription drugs they have as those drugs are usually for short-term use and intermittent use, such as analgesics and topical agents.

== Examples of commonly prescribed drugs ==
Two diseases from the top 10 causes of death introduced by the World Health Organization (WHO) in 2019 are used as examples, namely ischemic heart disease (ranked 1st) from cardiovascular diseases and Chronic Obstructive Pulmonary Disease from respiratory diseases (ranked 3rd). Although stroke is ranked 2nd by WHO, drugs used are similar to ischemic heart disease. Moreover, surgical interventions are commonly required, so it will be out of the scope of this article and it will not be introduced.

=== Ischemic Heart Disease ===
Ischemic Heart Disease (IHD) or coronary heart disease is the lack of supply of blood to an area in the heart, often due to plaque formation (atherosclerosis), causing inadequacy of oxygen to heart muscle and eventually leading to myocardial infarction. This disease can be classified into acute and chronic coronary heart disease. This disease caused 8.9 million deaths in 2019 and was ranked 1st in the top 10 causes of death globally by the World Health Organization (WHO).

The treatment of Ischemic Heart Disease can be divided into two directions: risk factor control and symptomatic relief.

Commonly prescribed drugs for Ischemic Heart Disease

Types of drug	Common Examples	Mechanism of benefit and effect	Side effects, caution & contraindications	Remarks
Beta-blockers	Metoprolol; Atenolol; Bisoprolol	Block beta-1 receptors in the heart → stop the effects of catecholamines on the heart→ reduce heart rate, heart contractility and conduction velocity → reduce the workload of the heart	Side effects: Bradycardia; Hypotension; Heart Block; Impaired glucose metabolism; Central Nervous System effects: fatigue, depression, insomnia	Aim to control heart rate to 55-60 beats per minute at rest; Used for symptomatic relief An image of metoprolol (Betaloc)
Beta-blockers	Metoprolol; Atenolol; Bisoprolol	Block beta-1 receptors in the heart → stop the effects of catecholamines on the heart→ reduce heart rate, heart contractility and conduction velocity → reduce the workload of the heart	Caution: Reduce the dose gradually over 2–3 weeks when withdrawing to avoid ischemia and myocardial infarction	Aim to control heart rate to 55-60 beats per minute at rest; Used for symptomatic relief An image of metoprolol (Betaloc)
Beta-blockers	Metoprolol; Atenolol; Bisoprolol	Block beta-1 receptors in the heart → stop the effects of catecholamines on the heart→ reduce heart rate, heart contractility and conduction velocity → reduce the workload of the heart	Contraindications: Pre-existing bradycardia; History of uncontrolled reactive airway disease (asthma); Severe Peripheral Arterial Disease (critical limb ischemia); Unstable HFrEF; Diabetes with frequent episodes of hypoglycemia	Aim to control heart rate to 55-60 beats per minute at rest; Used for symptomatic relief An image of metoprolol (Betaloc)
Calcium Channel Blockers (CCB)	Dihydropyridine (DHP) CCB: Amlodipine; Felodipine; Nifedipine SR	Block L-type calcium channels in arterial smooth muscle cells → reduce vasoconstriction → reduce arterial blood pressure	Side effects: Reflex tachycardia; Hypotension; Headache; Gingival hyperplasia; Peripheral edema	Avoid intake of food that interacts with CYP3A4, such as grapefruit and pomelo; Used for symptomatic relief An image of amlodipine tablets package (Norvasc)
Calcium Channel Blockers (CCB)	Dihydropyridine (DHP) CCB: Amlodipine; Felodipine; Nifedipine SR	Block L-type calcium channels in arterial smooth muscle cells → reduce vasoconstriction → reduce arterial blood pressure	Contraindications: HFrEF (for nifedipine); Obstructive myopathy	Avoid intake of food that interacts with CYP3A4, such as grapefruit and pomelo; Used for symptomatic relief An image of amlodipine tablets package (Norvasc)
Calcium Channel Blockers (CCB)	Non-DHP CCB: Verapamil; Diltiazem	Block L-type calcium channels in the myocardium → decrease heart rate and contractility	Side effects: Bradycardia; Hypotension; Heart block	Avoid intake of food that interacts with CYP3A4, such as grapefruit and pomelo; Used for symptomatic relief An image of amlodipine tablets package (Norvasc)
Calcium Channel Blockers (CCB)	Non-DHP CCB: Verapamil; Diltiazem	Block L-type calcium channels in the myocardium → decrease heart rate and contractility	Contraindications: HFrEF; Bradycardia; Sick sinus syndrome	Avoid intake of food that interacts with CYP3A4, such as grapefruit and pomelo; Used for symptomatic relief An image of amlodipine tablets package (Norvasc)
Calcium Channel Blockers (CCB)	Non-DHP CCB: Verapamil; Diltiazem	Block L-type calcium channels in the myocardium → decrease heart rate and contractility	Caution: CCB are CYP3A4 inhibitors, especially non-DHP CCB	Avoid intake of food that interacts with CYP3A4, such as grapefruit and pomelo; Used for symptomatic relief An image of amlodipine tablets package (Norvasc)
Nitrates	Nitroglycerin; Isosorbide mononitrate; Isosorbide dinitrate	Metabolized in body → release nitric oxide → increase cyclic guanosine monophosphate (cGMP) → vasodilating effects predominant on veins and epicardial coronary vessels → decrease preload, myocardial wall tension and increase blood flow to heart	Side effects: Headache; Flushing; Nausea; Postural hypotension; Syncope	Sublingual nitroglycerin is used for acute coronary syndrome; Isosorbide mononitrate and isosorbide dinitrate are used for symptomatic relief when blood pressure <130/80 mmHg; Not to be used as monotherapy in chronic coronary syndrome; An image of sublingual nitroglycerin tablets (Nitrostat)
Nitrates	Nitroglycerin; Isosorbide mononitrate; Isosorbide dinitrate	Metabolized in body → release nitric oxide → increase cyclic guanosine monophosphate (cGMP) → vasodilating effects predominant on veins and epicardial coronary vessels → decrease preload, myocardial wall tension and increase blood flow to heart	Caution: Avoid concomitant use of PDE-5 inhibitors; A nitrate-free period for 10–14 hours every day to prevent nitrate tolerance	Sublingual nitroglycerin is used for acute coronary syndrome; Isosorbide mononitrate and isosorbide dinitrate are used for symptomatic relief when blood pressure <130/80 mmHg; Not to be used as monotherapy in chronic coronary syndrome; An image of sublingual nitroglycerin tablets (Nitrostat)
Nitrates	Nitroglycerin; Isosorbide mononitrate; Isosorbide dinitrate	Metabolized in body → release nitric oxide → increase cyclic guanosine monophosphate (cGMP) → vasodilating effects predominant on veins and epicardial coronary vessels → decrease preload, myocardial wall tension and increase blood flow to heart	Contraindications: Hypertrophic obstructive cardiomyopathy	Sublingual nitroglycerin is used for acute coronary syndrome; Isosorbide mononitrate and isosorbide dinitrate are used for symptomatic relief when blood pressure <130/80 mmHg; Not to be used as monotherapy in chronic coronary syndrome; An image of sublingual nitroglycerin tablets (Nitrostat)
Non-steroidal anti-inflammatory drugs (NSAID)	Aspirin (low dose)	Block cyclooxygenase-1→ reduce thromboxane A2 production → reduce platelet activation and aggregation → reduce plaque formation and risk of adverse cardiovascular events	Side effects: Increased bleeding risk, especially in the stomach; Gastrointestinal irritation	Used in risk factor control and acute coronary syndrome; Dual antiplatelet therapy with P2Y12 inhibitors for a reduction of risk of major adverse cardiac events for all acute coronary syndrome patients; Concomitant use with proton pump inhibitors is recommended for patients who are at a high risk of gastrointestinal bleeding; Use at low dose: 75–100 mg orally once a day; An image of low-dose aspirin tablets (Gericare)
Non-steroidal anti-inflammatory drugs (NSAID)	Aspirin (low dose)	Block cyclooxygenase-1→ reduce thromboxane A2 production → reduce platelet activation and aggregation → reduce plaque formation and risk of adverse cardiovascular events	Caution: History of gastrointestinal bleeding	Used in risk factor control and acute coronary syndrome; Dual antiplatelet therapy with P2Y12 inhibitors for a reduction of risk of major adverse cardiac events for all acute coronary syndrome patients; Concomitant use with proton pump inhibitors is recommended for patients who are at a high risk of gastrointestinal bleeding; Use at low dose: 75–100 mg orally once a day; An image of low-dose aspirin tablets (Gericare)
Non-steroidal anti-inflammatory drugs (NSAID)	Aspirin (low dose)	Block cyclooxygenase-1→ reduce thromboxane A2 production → reduce platelet activation and aggregation → reduce plaque formation and risk of adverse cardiovascular events	Contraindications: Allergy to NSAID/aspirin; Patients with triad of asthma, rhinitis and nasal polyps	Used in risk factor control and acute coronary syndrome; Dual antiplatelet therapy with P2Y12 inhibitors for a reduction of risk of major adverse cardiac events for all acute coronary syndrome patients; Concomitant use with proton pump inhibitors is recommended for patients who are at a high risk of gastrointestinal bleeding; Use at low dose: 75–100 mg orally once a day; An image of low-dose aspirin tablets (Gericare)
P2Y12 Inhibitors	Clopidogrel; Prasugrel; Ticagrelor	Block P2Y12 receptors on platelets → prevent platelet activation by adenosine monophosphate (ADP) → prevent aggregation of platelets and plaque formation	Side effects: Increased bleeding risk; Rash (Clopidogrel)	Dual antiplatelet therapy with aspirin for a reduction of risk of major adverse cardiac events for all acute coronary syndrome patients; An image of clopidogrel tablet package (Plavix)
P2Y12 Inhibitors	Clopidogrel; Prasugrel; Ticagrelor	Block P2Y12 receptors on platelets → prevent platelet activation by adenosine monophosphate (ADP) → prevent aggregation of platelets and plaque formation	Caution: Metabolism of P2Y12 inhibitors requires CYP450 enzymes → potential drug interactions	Dual antiplatelet therapy with aspirin for a reduction of risk of major adverse cardiac events for all acute coronary syndrome patients; An image of clopidogrel tablet package (Plavix)
P2Y12 Inhibitors	Clopidogrel; Prasugrel; Ticagrelor	Block P2Y12 receptors on platelets → prevent platelet activation by adenosine monophosphate (ADP) → prevent aggregation of platelets and plaque formation	Contraindications: Prasugrel; Stroke; Older than 75 years old; Lighter than 60 kg	Dual antiplatelet therapy with aspirin for a reduction of risk of major adverse cardiac events for all acute coronary syndrome patients; An image of clopidogrel tablet package (Plavix)
Statins	Atorvastatin; Simvastatin; Rosuvastatin; Pravastatin	Inhibit HMG-CoA reductase → reduce cholesterol synthesis; Decrease high-sensitivity C-reactive protein; Pleiotropic properties: improve endothelial function and reduction of inflammation at coronary plaque	Side effects: Muscle weakness; Fatigue; Rhabdomyolysis; Hepatotoxicity	Used for risk factor control; If the maximum dose of statin cannot achieve the patient's goal, combination with ezetimibe is recommended.; An image of rosuvastatin tablets (Crestor)
Statins	Atorvastatin; Simvastatin; Rosuvastatin; Pravastatin	Inhibit HMG-CoA reductase → reduce cholesterol synthesis; Decrease high-sensitivity C-reactive protein; Pleiotropic properties: improve endothelial function and reduction of inflammation at coronary plaque	Caution: Atorvastatin and simvastatin are metabolized by CYP450 enzymes, leading to CYP450 enzymes related potential drug interactions	Used for risk factor control; If the maximum dose of statin cannot achieve the patient's goal, combination with ezetimibe is recommended.; An image of rosuvastatin tablets (Crestor)
Statins	Atorvastatin; Simvastatin; Rosuvastatin; Pravastatin	Inhibit HMG-CoA reductase → reduce cholesterol synthesis; Decrease high-sensitivity C-reactive protein; Pleiotropic properties: improve endothelial function and reduction of inflammation at coronary plaque	Contraindications: Active liver disease; Pregnancy or breastfeeding; Unexplained persistent increase of liver function test results	Used for risk factor control; If the maximum dose of statin cannot achieve the patient's goal, combination with ezetimibe is recommended.; An image of rosuvastatin tablets (Crestor)

=== Chronic Obstructive Pulmonary Disease (COPD) ===
Chronic Obstructive Pulmonary Disease (COPD) is a disease that causes chronic respiratory problems by gradually blocking the respiratory tracts. The continuous exposure to toxic fumes produced by cigarettes, vehicle engines and other human activities leads to inflammation of the respiratory tract, causing the development of COPD. The problem will deteriorate over time if it is not well managed. It will eventually cause respiratory failure and death in the late stage. It is the third deadliest disease reported by WHO in 2019 and it accounted for 6% of total deaths.

There are two types of management plan in COPD, namely regular treatment and acute exacerbation. In acute exacerbation, new medications will be added to the existing prescription and they will be stopped once the exacerbation is managed.

Types of drug	Common Examples	Mechanism of benefit and the effect	Side effect, caution & contraindications	Remarks
Short-acting beta2-agonist (SABA)	Salbutamol (albuterol); Terbutaline	Bind and activate beta2 adrenergic receptor on smooth muscles of respiratory tract → rise in cyclic AMP (cAMP) level in smooth muscle → relaxation of the smooth muscle	Side effect: Muscle tremor; Tachycardia and palpitations; Hypokalemia; Ventilation-perfusion V/Q mismatch; Metabolic effects	Quick relief of symptoms; FEV1 improvement is seen; Use when needed; Can be used in regular treatment and acute exacerbation; Effect only last for 4 – 6 hours for SABAs and 6–9 hours for SAMAs; Provided in inhalers → techniques for usage is important for management of COPD; Muscarinic antagonist can be considered as more effective than beta2 agonist → reduce the high vagal tone in patients; An image of salbutamol inhaler.
Short-acting beta2-agonist (SABA)	Salbutamol (albuterol); Terbutaline	Bind and activate beta2 adrenergic receptor on smooth muscles of respiratory tract → rise in cyclic AMP (cAMP) level in smooth muscle → relaxation of the smooth muscle	Caution: Should not be used with beta blockers; Cautious use in patients with cardiovascular diseases, hypokalemia, hyperthyroidism or diabetes	Quick relief of symptoms; FEV1 improvement is seen; Use when needed; Can be used in regular treatment and acute exacerbation; Effect only last for 4 – 6 hours for SABAs and 6–9 hours for SAMAs; Provided in inhalers → techniques for usage is important for management of COPD; Muscarinic antagonist can be considered as more effective than beta2 agonist → reduce the high vagal tone in patients; An image of salbutamol inhaler.
Short-acting beta2-agonist (SABA)	Salbutamol (albuterol); Terbutaline	Bind and activate beta2 adrenergic receptor on smooth muscles of respiratory tract → rise in cyclic AMP (cAMP) level in smooth muscle → relaxation of the smooth muscle	Contraindications: Hypersensitivity to the active drug or the excipients	Quick relief of symptoms; FEV1 improvement is seen; Use when needed; Can be used in regular treatment and acute exacerbation; Effect only last for 4 – 6 hours for SABAs and 6–9 hours for SAMAs; Provided in inhalers → techniques for usage is important for management of COPD; Muscarinic antagonist can be considered as more effective than beta2 agonist → reduce the high vagal tone in patients; An image of salbutamol inhaler.
Short-acting muscarinic antagonist (SAMA)	Ipratropium bromide; Oxitropium bromide	Interact with and block M3 muscarinic receptor on smooth muscles of respiratory tract → reduce acetylcholine activating postsynaptic M3 muscarinic receptor at neuromuscular junction → reduce bronchoconstriction ⇒ bronchodilation	Side effects: Generally not common → local action on airway smooth muscle; Most anticholinergic side effects as shown in atropine	Quick relief of symptoms; FEV1 improvement is seen; Use when needed; Can be used in regular treatment and acute exacerbation; Effect only last for 4 – 6 hours for SABAs and 6–9 hours for SAMAs; Provided in inhalers → techniques for usage is important for management of COPD; Muscarinic antagonist can be considered as more effective than beta2 agonist → reduce the high vagal tone in patients; An image of salbutamol inhaler.
Short-acting muscarinic antagonist (SAMA)	Ipratropium bromide; Oxitropium bromide	Interact with and block M3 muscarinic receptor on smooth muscles of respiratory tract → reduce acetylcholine activating postsynaptic M3 muscarinic receptor at neuromuscular junction → reduce bronchoconstriction ⇒ bronchodilation	Caution: Avoid the mist in contact with eyes; It may affect vision → do not drive or operate machines; Be cautious with the use in patients with narrow-angle glaucoma, benign prostatic hyperplasia and myasthenia gravis	Quick relief of symptoms; FEV1 improvement is seen; Use when needed; Can be used in regular treatment and acute exacerbation; Effect only last for 4 – 6 hours for SABAs and 6–9 hours for SAMAs; Provided in inhalers → techniques for usage is important for management of COPD; Muscarinic antagonist can be considered as more effective than beta2 agonist → reduce the high vagal tone in patients; An image of salbutamol inhaler.
Short-acting muscarinic antagonist (SAMA)	Ipratropium bromide; Oxitropium bromide	Interact with and block M3 muscarinic receptor on smooth muscles of respiratory tract → reduce acetylcholine activating postsynaptic M3 muscarinic receptor at neuromuscular junction → reduce bronchoconstriction ⇒ bronchodilation	Contraindications: Allergic to atropine	Quick relief of symptoms; FEV1 improvement is seen; Use when needed; Can be used in regular treatment and acute exacerbation; Effect only last for 4 – 6 hours for SABAs and 6–9 hours for SAMAs; Provided in inhalers → techniques for usage is important for management of COPD; Muscarinic antagonist can be considered as more effective than beta2 agonist → reduce the high vagal tone in patients; An image of salbutamol inhaler.
Long-acting beta2-agonist (LABA)	Formoterol; Salmeterol; Indacaterol; Olodaterol	Refer to SABA	Side effects and Contraindications: Refer to SABA	More preferred in regular treatment; Very long duration of action (12–24 hours); Huge improvement in lung function and symptoms; Risk of exacerbation greatly lowered → LAMA more prominent than LABA; Provided in inhalers → techniques for usage is important for management of COPD
Long-acting beta2-agonist (LABA)	Formoterol; Salmeterol; Indacaterol; Olodaterol	Refer to SABA	Caution: Should not be used in acute exacerbation for rapid relieve of symptoms	More preferred in regular treatment; Very long duration of action (12–24 hours); Huge improvement in lung function and symptoms; Risk of exacerbation greatly lowered → LAMA more prominent than LABA; Provided in inhalers → techniques for usage is important for management of COPD
Long-acting muscarinic antagonist (LAMA)	Tiotropium; Aclidinium bromide; Glycopyrronium bromide; Umeclidinium	Refer to SAMA	Side effects and Contraindications: Refer to SAMA	More preferred in regular treatment; Very long duration of action (12–24 hours); Huge improvement in lung function and symptoms; Risk of exacerbation greatly lowered → LAMA more prominent than LABA; Provided in inhalers → techniques for usage is important for management of COPD
Long-acting muscarinic antagonist (LAMA)	Tiotropium; Aclidinium bromide; Glycopyrronium bromide; Umeclidinium	Refer to SAMA	Caution: Should not be used in acute exacerbation for rapid relieve of symptoms	More preferred in regular treatment; Very long duration of action (12–24 hours); Huge improvement in lung function and symptoms; Risk of exacerbation greatly lowered → LAMA more prominent than LABA; Provided in inhalers → techniques for usage is important for management of COPD
Methylxanthines	Theophylline; Aminophylline	Inhibit PDEs in smooth muscle → reduce cAMP clearance → bronchodilation; Antagonize adenosine receptor → maintain sympathetic nervous system activity → bronchodilation; Methylxanthines also tackle inflammation but the exact mechanism is not clearly known	Side effects: Headache; Nausea / vomiting; Abdominal discomfort; Restlessness; Increased acid secretion; Arrhythmias at high dose	Narrow therapeutic range; Avoid drugs inducing / inhibiting CYP1A2 and CYP2E1
Methylxanthines	Theophylline; Aminophylline	Inhibit PDEs in smooth muscle → reduce cAMP clearance → bronchodilation; Antagonize adenosine receptor → maintain sympathetic nervous system activity → bronchodilation; Methylxanthines also tackle inflammation but the exact mechanism is not clearly known	Caution: Metabolised by CYP1A2 and CYP2E1; Smoking can induce methylxanthine metabolism	Narrow therapeutic range; Avoid drugs inducing / inhibiting CYP1A2 and CYP2E1
Methylxanthines	Theophylline; Aminophylline	Inhibit PDEs in smooth muscle → reduce cAMP clearance → bronchodilation; Antagonize adenosine receptor → maintain sympathetic nervous system activity → bronchodilation; Methylxanthines also tackle inflammation but the exact mechanism is not clearly known	Contraindications: Hypersensitivity to xanthines	Narrow therapeutic range; Avoid drugs inducing / inhibiting CYP1A2 and CYP2E1
Inhaled corticosteroid (ICS)	Fluticasone; Beclomethasone; Budesonide; Mometasone	Act on airway smooth muscle cells by activating intracellular glucocorticoid receptor → modifying gene expression in the cells: Promote lipocortin production; Inhibit production of inflammatory factors by phospholipase A2; Discourage biosynthesis of interleukin 1 (IL-1); Reduce inflammatory response	Side effects: Local; Dysphonia; Throat irritation and coughing; Oral thrush; Systemic; Less common; Dermal thinning	Not for monotherapy → commonly use in combination; Provided in inhalers → techniques for usage is important for management of COPD; Rinsing mouth with water, gargle and spit the water out, together with using MDIs with spacer can reduce oral thrush
Inhaled corticosteroid (ICS)	Fluticasone; Beclomethasone; Budesonide; Mometasone	Also act by enhancing the effect of beta2 agonists → correct and prevent the desensitization of beta2 receptors	Caution: Should not abruptly stopping treatment	Not for monotherapy → commonly use in combination; Provided in inhalers → techniques for usage is important for management of COPD; Rinsing mouth with water, gargle and spit the water out, together with using MDIs with spacer can reduce oral thrush
Inhaled corticosteroid (ICS)	Fluticasone; Beclomethasone; Budesonide; Mometasone	Also act by enhancing the effect of beta2 agonists → correct and prevent the desensitization of beta2 receptors	Contraindications: No known contraindications due to local action	Not for monotherapy → commonly use in combination; Provided in inhalers → techniques for usage is important for management of COPD; Rinsing mouth with water, gargle and spit the water out, together with using MDIs with spacer can reduce oral thrush
Phosphodiesterase-4 (PDE4) inhibitor	Roflumilast	Selectively blocking PDE4 on airway smooth muscles → increase intracellular cAMP level → induce action of protein kinase A → modulate inflammatory cytokine biosynthesis → reduce inflammation	Side effects: Diarrhea; Nausea; Headache; Weight loss; Psychiatric disturbance → suicidal thoughts	Not for rapid relief of symptoms; Reduce risk of exacerbation; Improved lung function is observed
Phosphodiesterase-4 (PDE4) inhibitor	Roflumilast	Selectively blocking PDE4 on airway smooth muscles → increase intracellular cAMP level → induce action of protein kinase A → modulate inflammatory cytokine biosynthesis → reduce inflammation	Caution: Metabolised by CYP3A4 and CYP1A2; Patient with history of depression / suicidal thought /action should be carefully examined and weight the risk and benefit of the administration	Not for rapid relief of symptoms; Reduce risk of exacerbation; Improved lung function is observed
Phosphodiesterase-4 (PDE4) inhibitor	Roflumilast	Selectively blocking PDE4 on airway smooth muscles → increase intracellular cAMP level → induce action of protein kinase A → modulate inflammatory cytokine biosynthesis → reduce inflammation	Contraindications: Moderate to severe liver impairment	Not for rapid relief of symptoms; Reduce risk of exacerbation; Improved lung function is observed
Mucolytics	Carbocisteine; N-acetylcysteine	Cleavage of S-S disulphur bond interlinking mucin polymer in the mucus → thinning the mucus and easier to be coughed out	Side effects: Headache; Diarrhea; Stomach pains	Used in acute exacerbation; Beneficial to patients not having ICS only
Mucolytics	Carbocisteine; N-acetylcysteine	Cleavage of S-S disulphur bond interlinking mucin polymer in the mucus → thinning the mucus and easier to be coughed out	Caution: History of stomach ulcers	Used in acute exacerbation; Beneficial to patients not having ICS only
Mucolytics	Carbocisteine; N-acetylcysteine	Cleavage of S-S disulphur bond interlinking mucin polymer in the mucus → thinning the mucus and easier to be coughed out	Contraindications: Allergy to the active pharmaceutical product or any excipients inside; Active peptic ulcer	Used in acute exacerbation; Beneficial to patients not having ICS only
Systemic corticosteroids	Prednisone	Refer to ICS	Side effects: Mostly related to long-term administration; Adrenocortical insufficiency; Fluid retention; Weight gain; Bone loss (osteoporosis); Cataract; Diabetes	Used in acute exacerbation; Usually used for 5 days; Can be used orally or by intravascular injection; It can be abruptly discontinued without any tapering
Systemic corticosteroids	Prednisone	Refer to ICS	Caution: Should not abruptly stopping treatment	Used in acute exacerbation; Usually used for 5 days; Can be used orally or by intravascular injection; It can be abruptly discontinued without any tapering
Systemic corticosteroids	Prednisone	Refer to ICS	Contraindications: Systemic fungal infections; More but not common in short term usage	Used in acute exacerbation; Usually used for 5 days; Can be used orally or by intravascular injection; It can be abruptly discontinued without any tapering
Antibiotics	Amoxicillin / clavulanic acid; Macrolides; Tetracycline	Amoxicillin: Interact with penicillin-binding proteins → prevent peptidoglycan layer formation in the bacteria → bacteria lack of protection and burst due to water absorption; Clavulanic acid: Block beta-lactamase activity in bacteria → restore activity of penicillin-like antibiotics; Macrolides: Interact with 50-S subunit of the bacterial ribosome → stop bacterial protein synthesis; Tetracycline: Interact with ribosomal 30-S subunit of bacteria → prevent bacterial protein synthesis; An image showing mechanism of action of antibiotics	Side effects: For all antibiotics; Disturbance of gastrointestinal system (e.g. diarrhea and nausea) due to the effect on gut microflora.; Amoxicillin / clavulanic acid; Allergic reactions if allergic to penicillin; Macrolides; Skin rashes; Eosinophilia; Tetracyclines; Enamel dysplasia; Photosensitivity; Tooth discoloration	Used in acute exacerbation; 5–7 days of treatment is considered; Risk of exacerbation can be lessen by regular use of macrolides; Only be used when the patient experience three cardinal symptoms of COPD exacerbation: worsening dyspnea, increasing sputum production and purulence
Antibiotics	Amoxicillin / clavulanic acid; Macrolides; Tetracycline		Caution: Change to other type if allergic to specific type; Possible drug interactions; Avoid tetracycline when there is pre-existing renal or hepatic impairment; Dose adjustment needed for amoxicillin / clavulanic acid in patients with renal impairment	Used in acute exacerbation; 5–7 days of treatment is considered; Risk of exacerbation can be lessen by regular use of macrolides; Only be used when the patient experience three cardinal symptoms of COPD exacerbation: worsening dyspnea, increasing sputum production and purulence
Antibiotics	Amoxicillin / clavulanic acid; Macrolides; Tetracycline		Contraindications: Pregnancy (for tetracycline); Allergy	Used in acute exacerbation; 5–7 days of treatment is considered; Risk of exacerbation can be lessen by regular use of macrolides; Only be used when the patient experience three cardinal symptoms of COPD exacerbation: worsening dyspnea, increasing sputum production and purulence

==== Combination inhalers ====
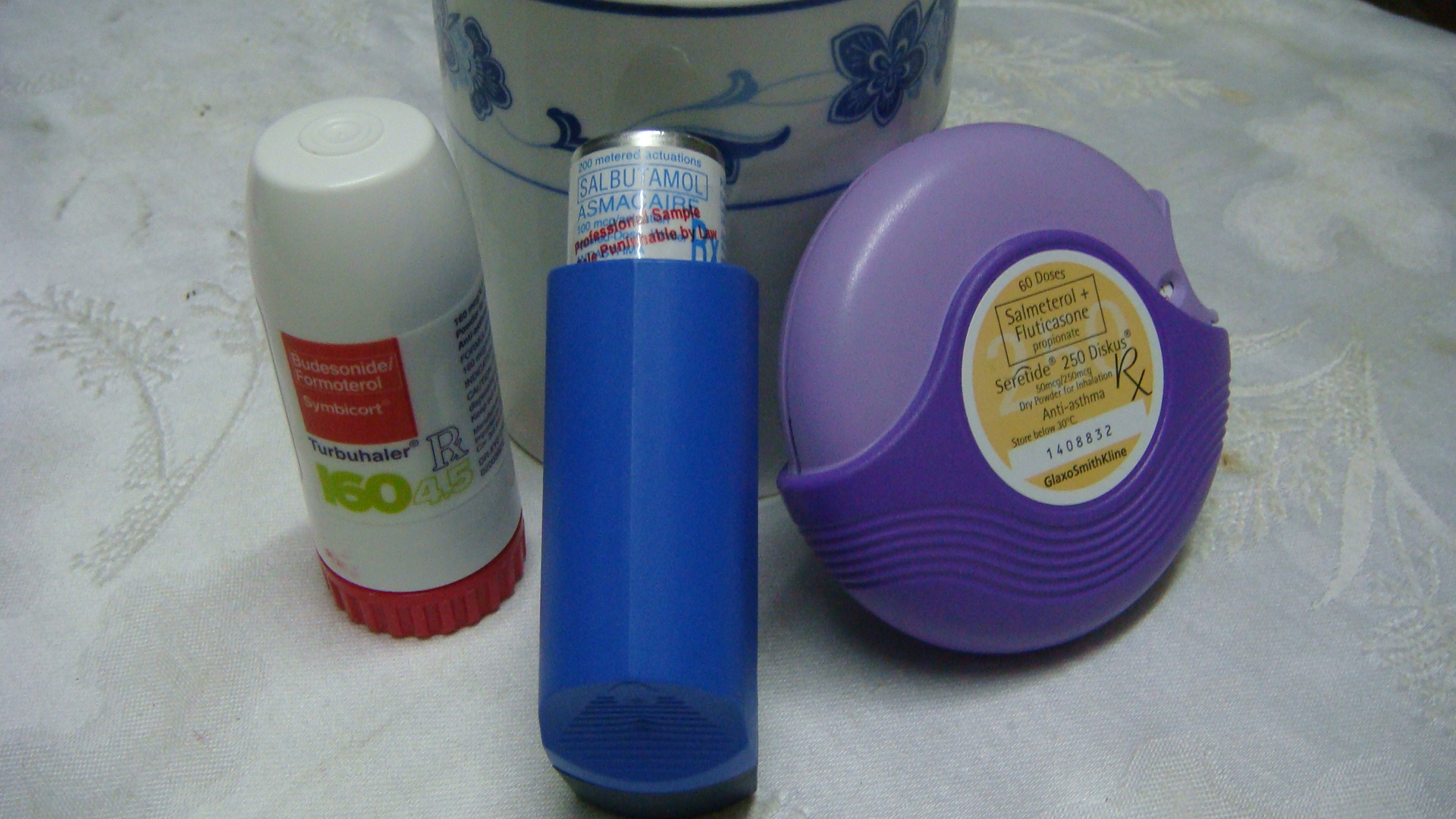
An image of different types of inhalers.

In patients with COPD, multiple inhalers need to be used at a time. There are two major types of inhaler, namely dry-powder inhaler(DPI) and metered-dose inhaler(MDI), and many more subtypes with different techniques for using them. Adherence is also an issue with the use of multiple inhalers. Generally with different types of inhalers, the adherence will be lowered. Proper inhaler technique and adherence are two of the factors that affect the management of COPD. Other factors include smoking cessation and participation in physical activities, to name but a few. With inappropriately applied inhaler technique and low adherence, there will be ineffective management of COPD, thus increasing in the burden on the healthcare sector. As a result, inhalers combining multiple medications are invented to tackle the problem.

Medication combined	Examples	Benefits
SABA+SAMA	Salbutamol / ipratropium (MDI)	The improvement in symptoms and FEV1 is greater than the use of SABA or SAMA alone
LABA+LAMA	Formoterol / aclidinium (DPI); Formoterol / glycopyrronium (MDI); Indacaterol / glycopyrronium (DPI); Vilanterol / umeclidinium (DPI); Olodaterol / tiotropium (Respimat)	Lower rate of acute exacerbation when used in combination; Less symptoms and better improvement in lung function
ICS+LAMA	Formoterol / beclometasone (MDI / DPI); Formoterol / budesonide (MDI / DPI); Formoterol / mometasone (MDI); Salmeterol / fluticasone propionate (MDI / DPI); Vilanterol / fluticasone furoate (DPI)	Perform better than individual medication to improve lung function; Better health status is obtained compared to individual medications; Greater reduction in risk of exacerbation than ICS or LAMA solely
LABA+LAMA+ICS	Fluticasone / umeclidinium / vilanterol (DPI); Beclometasone / formoterol / glycopyrronium (MDI); Budesonide / formoterol / glycopyrrolate (MDI)	Better improvement of lung function and symptom; Obtaining better health status; Larger decline in exacerbation risk than all combined inhalers and LAMA.
