= Asthma trigger =

Factor that provokes symptoms of asthma

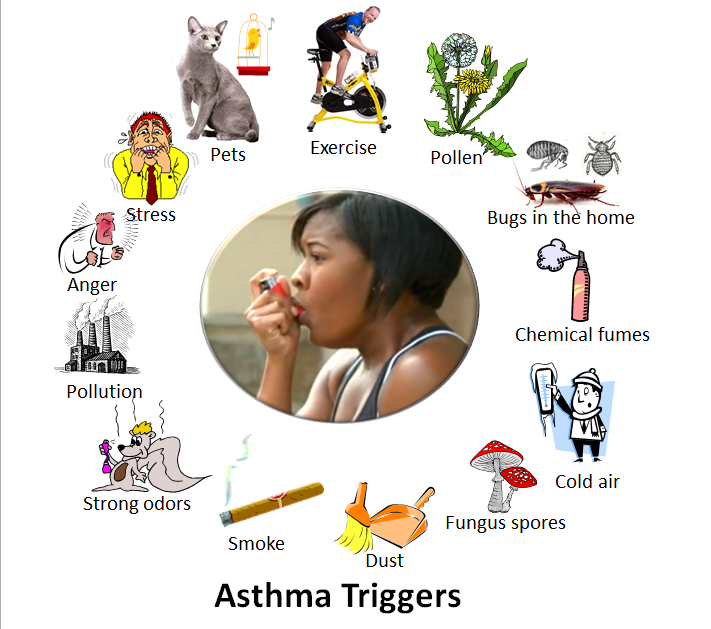
Examples of asthma triggers

Asthma triggers are factors or stimuli that provoke the exacerbation of asthma symptoms or increase the degree of airflow disruption, which can lead to an asthma attack. An asthma attack is characterized by an obstruction of the airway, hypersecretion of mucus and bronchoconstriction due to the contraction of smooth muscles around the respiratory tract. Its symptoms include a wide range of manifestations such as breathlessness, coughing, a tight chest and wheezing.

An asthma attack is usually mediated by an inflammatory pathway, where a trigger such as an allergen could lead to a series of immune responses mediated by various types of immune cells.

Common triggers for asthma include allergens like pet dander, dust mites, pollens and molds. Other types of triggers like exercise, air pollutants, tobacco smoke, humidity, cold air, or certain medicines may also play a role in triggering asthma. While it has been proposed that asthma triggers can be classified into three types – allergic triggers, environmental triggers and physical triggers – a universal categorization of asthma triggers has yet to be done. Other studies have also classified asthma triggers into psychological factors, air pollutants, physical activity, allergens and infection.

Asthma is an extremely common chronic disease, affecting over 26 million people and 7 million children in the US. Recognizing the trigger for asthma and avoiding it can be a simple yet effective way to deal with the disease and avoid an asthma attack. Although a cure for asthma is yet to be invented, various treatment methods are available for both long-term control and immediate relief of an asthma attack.

== Pathophysiology ==
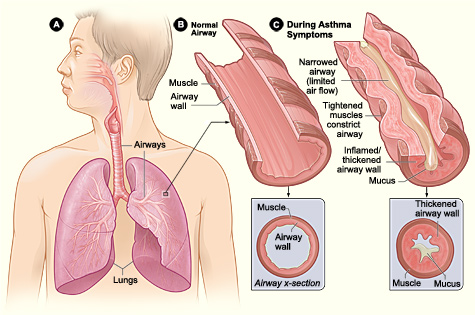
Figure showing the physiological changes in the respiratory tract during an asthma attack upon contact with a trigger

The pathophysiology for asthma mainly involves the inflammatory pathway, associated with several types of immune cells in the body, mainly T helper 2 cells (Th2 cells), B cells and mast cells. As a stimulus, such as an allergen, comes into contact with an asthma patient, it activates various types of immune cells leading to an inflammatory response, causing bronchial hyperresponsiveness, bronchoconstriction, excessive mucus secretion, airflow obstruction and an asthma attack.

First, during the sensitization phase, where T cells interact with dendritic cells, the dendritic cells will present a specific antigen from the allergen to Th2 cells, leading to their development. Afterward, the activated Th2 cells would release interleukine-4, a type of cytokine to promote B cells, another type of immune cell to differentiate intoallergen-specific memory B cells and plasma cells. The plasma cells will then extensively produce allergen-specific IgE antibodies, which are captured by a type of receptor, FceRI, on the mast cells.

Mast cells are immune cells usually located at tissues exposed to the environment, such as the skin, respiratory tract mucosa and digestive tract mucosa. They are equipped with preformed granules loaded with vasoactive amines and proteases. As the FceRI receptors on mast cells capture the IgE antibodies produced by Th2 cells, they become sensitive to the specific allergen.

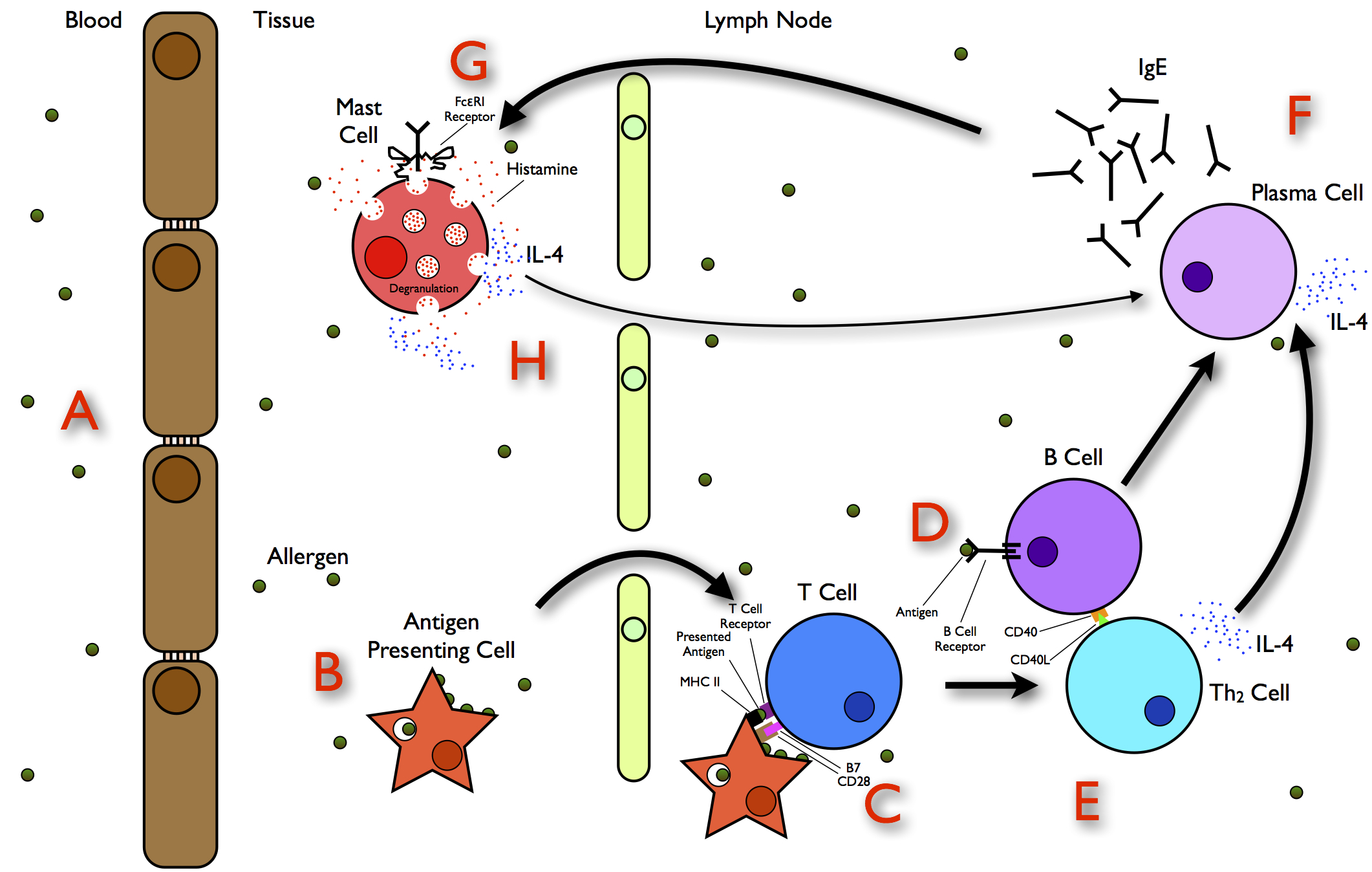
Diagram showing the typical pathway for an allergic response leading to asthma

Due to this, the mast cells will be activated when they are exposed to the specific allergen. As an allergen binds to the IgE antibodies on the mast cell surface, clustering and cross-link formation of FceRI takes place. This leads to the recruitment and activation of several tyrosine kinases, a type of enzyme that phosphorylates protein. Consequently, this kinase activation contributes to intracellular Ca2+ influx after a series of reactions. The Ca2+ level surge results in cytoskeletal rearrangement, allowing exocytosis and degranulation of intracellular granules, thus releasing vasoactive amines and proteases. These vasoactive amines such as histamine, heparin and serotonin released from the mast cell granules cause vasodilation, increased vascular permeability, smooth muscle contraction and increased mucus secretion. Mast cell degranulation also results in the release of eosinophil chemotactic factors and neutrophil chemotactic factors. These factors attract eosinophils and neutrophils from the body respectively, which can intensify the inflammation response. In addition, the elevated Ca2+ level also leads to arachidonic acid enzymatic pathway activation, contributing to the release of lipid mediators. These lipid mediators, particularly prostaglandins and leukotrienes, elicit vasodilation, increased vascular permeability and smooth muscle contraction. The increase in Ca2+ level also leads to the activation of certain transcription factors, which induces pro-inflammatory cytokine transcription. These pro-inflammatory cytokines, such as TNF, Interleukin-1 and Interleukin-8, lead to acute inflammation and leukocyte recruitment.

== Examples of asthma triggers ==
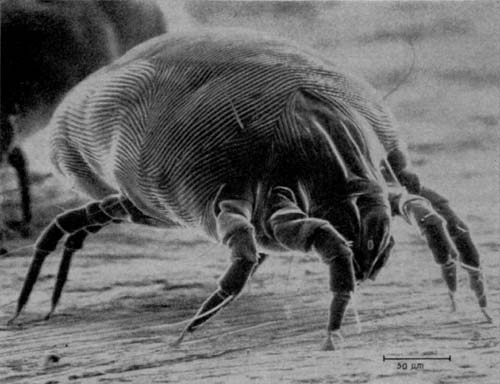
Microscopic image of a house dust mite, which can trigger asthma

=== Allergic triggers ===
Allergic triggers are factors or chemicals that could induce airway sensitization, inflammation, bronchospasm and other asthmatic symptoms.

Allergens are the most common trigger for allergic asthma. Examples of such triggers of asthma include naturally occurring aeroallergens like house dust mites, animal feces and pollen. Pets, molds and pests are also potential triggers. When an asthma patient inhales or come into contact withsuch allergen, mast cells in the airway tract releases vasoactive amines and proteases. This leads to a release of cytokines and mediates a broad range of inflammatory and allergic responses.

=== Environmental triggers ===
In addition to allergens, studies have revealed that environmental factors may also increase the risk of triggering an asthma attack. Examples of these factors include respiratory tract viral infections, exposure to air pollutants such as ozone or a change in lifestyle that involves a decrease in exposure to microbes and their products like endotoxin. Although its mechanism of action is still unknown, an in vivo study has demonstrated that these environmental factors lead to the accumulation of neutrophil extracellular traps (NET) releasing neutrophils in the lungs. This increased release of NETs have been found to be associated with asthmatic symptoms such as mucus hypersecretion.

Another environmental risk factor is exposure to formaldehyde. Formaldehyde itself is a chemical that can cause irritation to the respiratory tract. In addition, it may react with macromolecules such as albumin which can induce the production of igE antibodies which can bind to mast cells and lead to hyperresponsiveness of the respiratory tract.

=== Exercise ===
Exercise-induced asthma is common in most asthma patients. Although the mechanism for such a phenomenon is still unclear, researchers have proposed that as the body gasps for more oxygen during exercise, more cold and dry air is inhaled. The passage of this cold and dry air causes a loss of moisture from the mucosal membrane of the respiratory tract. The osmolarity changes brought by such action can lead to an increased release of proinflammatory mediators such as cytokines, leading to a hypersensitivity of the airway. Cooling of the respiratory tract may also activate cholinergic receptors, which can induce bronchoconstriction and mucus secretion, further narrowing the airway. Swimmers with asthma may also inhale an excess amount of contaminated and irritating air with compound derived from chlorine gas, which can increase the risk of an asthma attack.

=== Medications ===
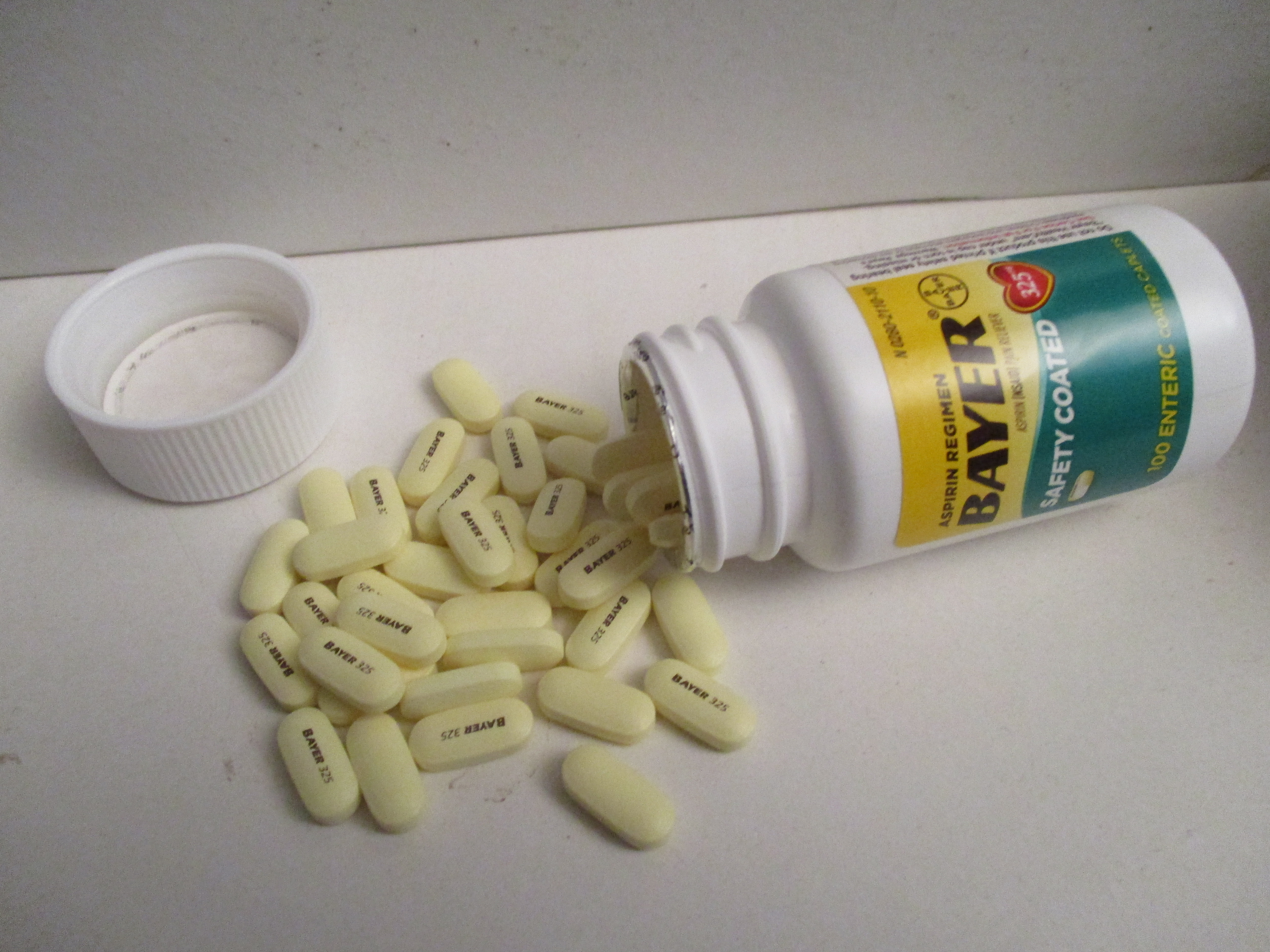
Aspirin, which can be a trigger for asthma in some patients

Aspirin induced asthma, or aspirin-exacerbated respiratory disease, refers to situations where the use of aspirin worsen the asthma conditions. Other non-steroidal anti-inflammatory drugs (NSAIDs) that inhibits the enzyme, cyclooxygenase-1, may also lead to an asthma attack.

After the inhibition of cyclooxygenase-1 enzyme by the NSAIDs, an accumulation of arachidonic acid will be resulted. This, in turn, would increase the production of leukotrienes. Leukotrienes are an inflammatory mediator. The accumulation of proinflammatory leukotrienes would overstimulate the cysteinyl leukotriene receptors in the respiratory system, leading to bronchoconstriction and the over-secretion of mucus, thus blocking the airway.

Beta-blocker, or beta-adrenergic antagonists, may also induce bronchial constriction and block the action of other beta-receptor targeted asthmatic drugs, leading to a worsening asthma condition. Therefore, asthma patients should be cautious and inform their physicians of their asthma conditions.

=== Occupational asthma triggers ===
Occupational asthma refers to a type of asthma that is resulted from repeated exposure to an agent that causes or exacerbates asthma in a workplace. Although the primary cause for occupational asthma varies from situation to situation, common agents such as metal, diesel, cleaning agents, dimethylsulphate, diisocyanates, latex, persulfate, aldehydes, isocyanates, wood dusts and flour should be handled with great care.

=== Tobacco smoke ===
Both first-hand and second-hand tobacco smoke can be a trigger for asthma attack. It may worsen the condition of asthma as it is an irritant and induces bronchoconstriction.

=== Psychological triggers ===
Studies have also indicated that psychological stress may be associated with a higher chance of asthma attack. Patients with psychological stress are found to have a reduced awareness of controlling asthma and poor physical health.

== Symptoms ==
One of the clinical asthmatic symptoms is shortness of breath due to narrowing of the respiratory tract, caused by mucus plug formation and bronchoconstriction as smooth muscles contract. Another typical symptom is wheezing. During expiration, turbulent airflow crushes the narrowed respiratory tract, leading to a wheezing sound. Moreover, the increased mucus secretion may not be limited to the respiratory tract, and other symptoms such as watery eyes and rhinitis are also common. Furthermore, increased vasodilation and vascular permeability may result in angioedema, the swelling of the skin, and hives. In severe complications, as ventilation is impaired, acute respiratory failure may occur due to the inadequate amount of oxygen in the circulatory system. Another life-threatening condition is pneumothorax, the collapse of the lungs due to hyperinflation.

== Avoidance ==
Understanding the specific asthma triggers for a patient and avoiding them can be a simple way for preventing an asthma attack. Regularly washing beddings, quitting smoking, doing pest controls, keeping a sensitized living environment, removing stagnant water, avoiding products with potential irritants, etc., can be effective in avoiding an asthma attack.

Education about asthma triggers should be done by physicians to help patients understand what activities or materials should be avoided. Reduction of exposure to asthma triggers should be done by asthmatic patient as well. Parents of asthmatic children should also be cautious of common asthma triggers in order to reduce risks of an asthma attack.

== Treatment ==
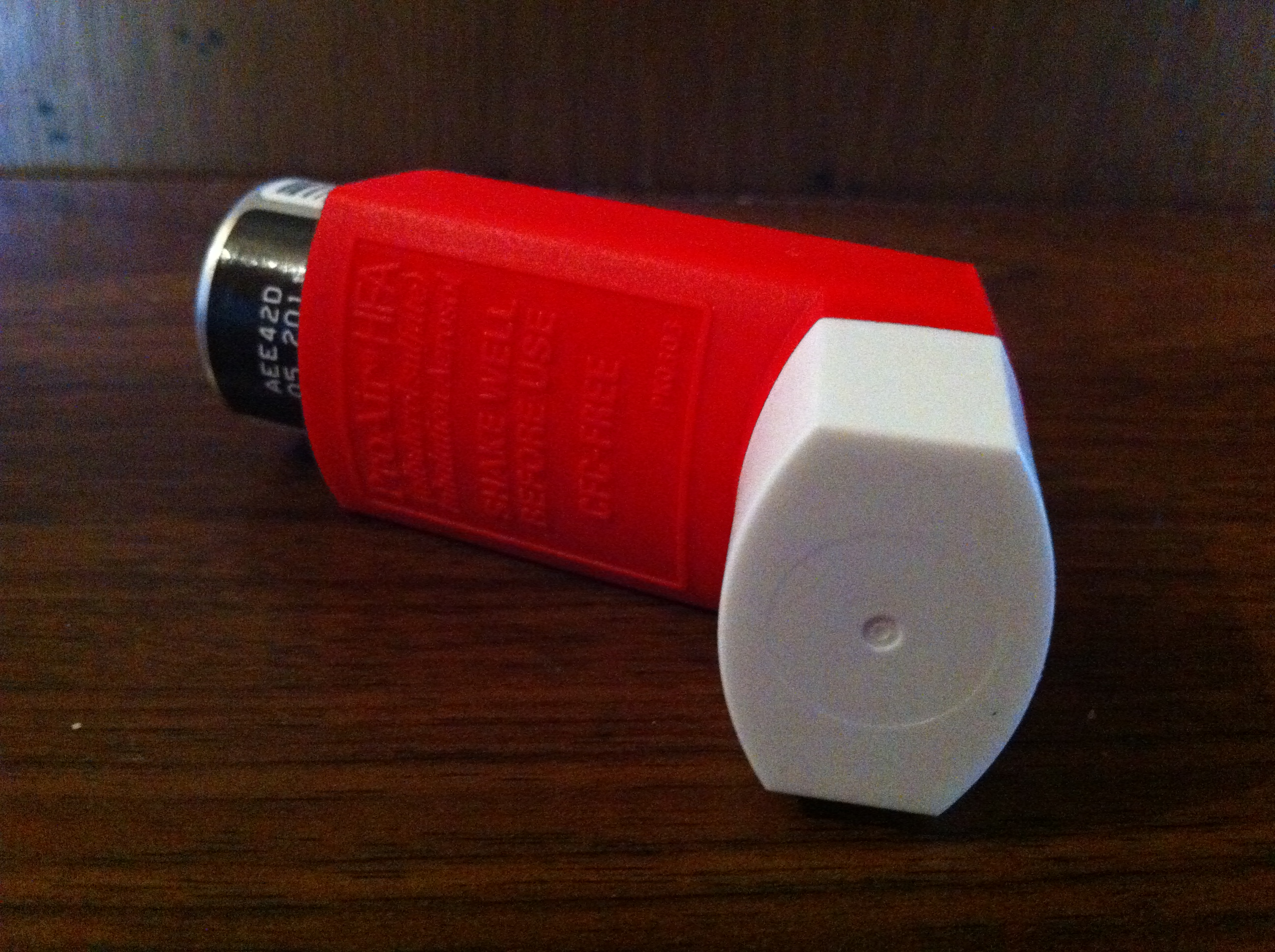
An asthma medication inhaler, which can be used to administer the medicine through the pulmonary route

=== Quick-relief medicine ===
Quick-relief medicine are used for treating an acute asthma attack. The first line of medicine for treating this situation is short-term beta-2-adrenoreceptor agonists, which are drugs that can stimulate the beta-2 adrenergic receptors. They are bronchodilators and can effectively relieve the symptoms by clearing the airway. Examples include albuterol and levalbuterol. Commonly they are used with a portable inhaler which allows the patient to administer the medicine at once during an attack.

Another common medicine for an acute attack is anticholinergic drugs such as ipratropium and tiotropium, which are also bronchodilators. They work by blocking off the cholinergic receptors and reduces mucus secretion and bronchoconstriction.

Another type of treatment for acute asthma attack is immunosuppressive drugs like corticosteroids, which can also alleviate an asthmatic response. Examples include prednisone and methyl prednisone which are usually administered orally or intravenously for treating an acute situation. However, note that long term use of corticosteroids may lead to severe side effects.

=== Long-term control ===
Continuous and long-term use of certain medicines can help reduce the risk of an asthma attack and keep the disease under control.

Chemical structure of prednisolone, a corticosteroid that can help relieve an acute asthma attack

Long-term use of certain types of corticosteroids, such as fluticasone propionate, may be administered through the pulmonary route to reduce the risk of an asthma attack.

Oral use of leukotriene receptor antagonists such as zafirlukast may also be used as long-term control for asthma in addition to corticosteroids.

Moreover, another option is the use of cromolyn sodium, which can prevent an asthma attack by halting Ca2+ influx, thus preventing mast cell degranulation and subsequent asthmatic complications

Other than drugs, an alternative treatment method is de-sensitization, which involves exposure to a well-controlled, small and increasing amounts of specific allergen over a long duration of time. The rationale is to trigger antigen competition by the development of allergen-specific IgG antibodies, which can reduce to risk of an allergic response.

Long-acting beta-agonists such as salmetrol had been used in combination with corticosteroids to control asthma symptoms. They are drugs that can stimulate the beta-2 adrenergic receptors and mediate a bronchodilation effect for over 12 hours. However, a 2010 study has found that this treatment method could increase the risk of asthma-related deaths and intubations. The Food and Drug Administration (FDA) also recommends the discontinuation of the drug if asthma control has been achieved.
