= Respimat =

Drug delivery device used for the treatment of respiratory conditions

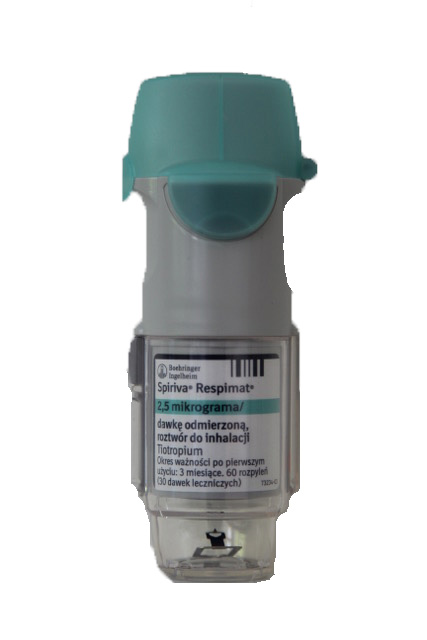

Respimat, also known as Respimat Soft Mist Inhaler, is a drug delivery device used for the treatment of asthma, chronic obstructive pulmonary disease (COPD), and other respiratory conditions.

Its developer, Boehringer Ingelheim, is currently conducting approved in the U.S. with a variety of their products, such as tiotropium and ipratropium/salbutamol. According to the manufacturer, the reusability of the inhaler reduces its carbon footprint by 71%.

== Sources ==
- Home — Respimat International
