= Mometasone/formoterol =

Combination drug

Combination of
- Mometasone furoate: Corticosteroid
- Formoterol fumarate: Long-acting β_{2} adrenoreceptor agonist (LABA)

Clinical data
- Trade names: Zenhale, Dulera, others
- AHFS/Drugs.com: Professional Drug Facts
- License data: US DailyMed: Dulera
- Routes of administration: Inhalation (Metered-dose inhaler MDI)
- ATC code: R03AK09 (WHO)

Legal status
- Legal status: CA: ℞-only; US: ℞-only

Identifiers
- CAS Number: 1609016-84-3
- KEGG: D10295

Mometasone/formoterol, sold under the brand name Dulera among others, is a fixed-dose combination medication used in the long-term treatment of asthma. It contains mometasone a steroid and formoterol a long-acting beta agonist. It is only recommended in those for whom an inhaled steroid is not sufficient. It is used by inhalation.

Common side effects include headache and sinusitis. More serious side effects may include thrush, immunosuppression, allergic reactions, and cataracts. Use is not recommended in those less than twelve years of age. It has not been studied during pregnancy or breastfeeding. Mometasone works by decreasing inflammation while formoterol works by relaxing smooth muscle in the airways.

The combination was approved for medical use in the United States in 2010. No generic version is available as of 2019. In 2021, it was the 215th most commonly prescribed medication in the United States, with more than 1 million prescriptions. It is on the World Health Organization's List of Essential Medicines.

== Medical use ==
It is used in the long-term treatment of asthma.

It is not for the treatment of acute bronchospasm. To relieve acute symptoms, a rapid-onset short-duration inhaled bronchodilator (such as salbutamol) should be available.

== Warnings and precautions ==
Long-acting β adrenoreceptor agonists (LABAs) are subject to a boxed warning against the possibility of an increased risk of asthma-related death. Formoterol belongs to the LABA class of drugs. As there does not exist at the time of the monograph's publication adequate research to determine whether the rate of asthma-related death is increased with formoterol, it is therefore recommended by the FDA that LABAs only be used for patients not adequately controlled on other asthma controlling medications or whose disease severity clearly warrants initiation of dual therapy.

== Side effects ==
The most commonly reported side effects were: oral thrush, nausea, headache, and pain in the pharynx or larynx. More rarely reported side effects (occurring in <1% of patients during the clinical trial) include: tachycardia, palpitations, dry mouth, allergic reaction (bronchospasm, dermatitis, hives), pharyngitis, muscle spasms, tremor, dizziness, insomnia, nervousness, and hypertension. Patients experiencing an allergic reaction or increase in difficulty breathing while using this medication should immediately discontinue its use and contact their physician.

== Society and culture ==
=== Legal status ===
Zenhale was approved in Canada in 2011. Dulera was approved by the Food and Drug Administration (FDA) in the United States in June 2010. Zenhale's marketing application was voluntarily withdrawn from the EU due to the manufacturer's inability to provide additional information in the necessary timeframe.

=== Formulation ===
Mometasone/formoterol is available in a pressurized MDI (pMDI) in three strengths (in micrograms of mometasone/micrograms of formoterol): 50/5, 100/5, and 200/5.
