= Exercise-induced bronchoconstriction =

Exercise-induced Bronchoconstriction
- Other names: EIA
- Specialty: Pulmonology
- Symptoms: Shortness of breath on vigorous exercise
- Usual onset: Rapid, on exercise
- Duration: For the duration of activity and some time afterwards
- Causes: Moderate to high intensity exercise

Exercise-induced bronchoconstriction (EIB) occurs when the airways narrow as a result of exercise. This condition has been referred to as exercise-induced asthma (EIA); however, this term is no longer preferred. While exercise does not cause asthma, it is frequently an asthma trigger.

It might be expected that people with EIB would present with shortness of breath, and/or an elevated respiratory rate and wheezing, consistent with an asthma attack. However, many will present with decreased stamina, or difficulty in recovering from exertion compared to team members, or paroxysmal coughing from an irritable airway. Similarly, examination may reveal wheezing and prolonged expiratory phase, or may be quite normal. Consequently, a potential for under-diagnosis exists. Measurement of airflow, such as peak expiratory flow rates, which can be done inexpensively on the track or sideline, may prove helpful. In athletes, symptoms of bronchospasm such as chest discomfort, breathlessness, and fatigue are often falsely attributed to the individual being out of shape, having asthma, or possessing a hyperreactive airway rather than EIB.

== Cause ==
While the potential triggering events for EIB are well recognized, the underlying pathogenesis is poorly understood. It usually occurs after at least several minutes of vigorous, aerobic activity, which increases oxygen demand to the point where breathing through the nose (nasal breathing) must be supplemented by mouth breathing. The resultant inhalation of air that has not been warmed and humidified by the nasal passages seems to generate increased blood flow to the linings of the bronchial tree, resulting in edema. Constriction of these small airways then follows, worsening the degree of obstruction to airflow. There is increasing evidence that the smooth muscle that lines the airways becomes progressively more sensitive to changes that occur as a result of injury to the airways from dehydration. The chemical mediators that provoke the muscle spasm appear to arise from mast cells. Mouth breathing as a result of decreased nasal breathing also increases lung surface exposure to irritants, pollutants, and allergens, causing neutrophilic inflammation in response to reactive oxygen species formation; research has found that individuals with genetically hindered glutathione counteraction of this oxidative stress are likely at a higher risk of developing EIB.

== Diagnosis ==
Exercise-induced bronchoconstriction can be difficult to diagnose clinically given the lack of specific symptoms and frequent misinterpretation as manifestations of vigorous exercise. There are many mimics that present with similar symptoms, such as vocal cord dysfunction, cardiac arrhythmias, cardiomyopathies, and gastroesophageal reflux disease. It is also important to distinguish those who have asthma with exercise worsening, and who consequently will have abnormal testing at rest, from true exercise-induced bronchoconstriction, where there will be normal baseline results. Because of the wide differential diagnosis of exertional respiratory complaints, the diagnosis of exercise-induced bronchoconstriction based on history and self-reported symptoms alone has been shown to be inaccurate and to result in an incorrect diagnosis more than 50% of the time. An important and often overlooked differential diagnosis is exercise-induced laryngeal obstruction (EILO). The latter can co-exist with EIB and is best differentiated using objective testing and continuous laryngoscopy during exercise (CLE) testing.

=== Spirometry ===
Objective testing should begin with spirometry at rest. In true exercise-induced bronchoconstriction, the results should be within normal limits. Should resting values be abnormal, then asthma, or some other chronic lung condition, is present. There is, of course, no reason why asthma and exercise-induced bronchoconstriction should not co-exist but the distinction is important because without successful treatment of underlying asthma, treatment of an exercise component will likely be unsuccessful. If baseline testing is normal, some form of exercise or pharmacologic stress will be required, either on the sideline or practice venue, or in the laboratory.

=== Exercise testing ===
Treadmill or ergometer-based testing in lung function laboratories are effective methods for diagnosing exercise-induced bronchoconstriction, but may result in false negatives if the exercise stimulus is not intense enough.

=== Field-exercise challenge ===
Field-exercise challenge tests that involve the athlete performing the sport in which they are normally involved and assessing FEV_{1} after exercise are helpful if abnormal but have been shown to be less sensitive than eucapnic voluntary hyperventilation.

==== Eucapnic voluntary hyperventilation challenge ====
The International Olympic Committee recommends the eucapnic voluntary hyperventilation (EVH) challenge as the test to document exercise-induced asthma in Olympic athletes. In the EVH challenge, the patient voluntarily, without exercising, rapidly breathes dry air enriched with 5% CO_{2} for six minutes. The presence of the enriched CO_{2} compensates for the CO_{2} losses in the expired air, not matched by metabolic production, that occurs during hyperventilation, and so maintains CO_{2} levels at normal.

==== Medication challenge ====
Medication challenge tests, such as the methacholine challenge test, have a lower sensitivity for detection of exercise-induced bronchoconstriction in athletes and are also not a recommended first-line approach in the evaluation of exercise-induced asthma.

Mannitol inhalation has been recently approved for use in the United States.

A relatively recent review of the literature has concluded that there is currently insufficient available evidence to conclude that either mannitol inhalation or eucapnic voluntary hyperventilation are suitable alternatives to exercise challenge testing to detect exercise-induced bronchoconstriction and that additional research is required.

== Treatment ==
=== Lifestyle ===
The best treatment is avoidance of conditions predisposing to attacks, when possible. In athletes who wish to continue their sport or do so in adverse conditions, preventive measures include altered training techniques and medications.

Some take advantage of the refractory period by precipitating an attack by "warming up," and then timing competition such that it occurs during the refractory period. Step-wise training works in a similar fashion. Warm up occurs in stages of increasing intensity, using the refractory period generated by each stage to reach a full workload.

=== Medication ===
There is no evidence supporting different treatment for EIB in asthmatic athletes and nonathletes. The most common medication used is a beta agonist taken about 20 minutes before exercise. A meta-analysis estimated that beta-agonists reduce the decline in FEV1 by 90%. Some physicians prescribe inhaled anti-inflammatory mists such as corticosteroids or leukotriene antagonists, and mast cell stabilizers have also proven effective.

In May 2013, the American Thoracic Society issued the first treatment guidelines for EIB, recommending use of "a short-acting β2-agonist before exercise in all patients with EIB. For patients who continue to have symptoms of EIB despite the administration of a short-acting β2-agonist before exercise, strong recommendations were made for a daily inhaled corticosteroid, a daily leukotriene receptor antagonist, or a mast cell stabilizing agent before exercise."

There is conflicting information about the value of theophylline and other methylxanthines as prophylaxis against exercise-induced bronchoconstriction.

In three small randomized trials, vitamin C administration on average halved the decline in FEV1 after exercise, but the practical importance of these findings is not clear.

=== Research ===
A crossover study compared oral montelukast with inhaled salmeterol, both given two hours before exercise, showing that the drugs had similar benefit.

== Prevalence in athletes ==
Olympic swimmers Tom Dolan, Amy Van Dyken, and Nancy Hogshead, Olympic track star Jackie Joyner-Kersee, baseball Hall of Famer Catfish Hunter, and American football player Jerome Bettis are among the many who have the condition. Tour de France winner Chris Froome reported that he has the condition, after being spotted using a nasal inhaler during race. Other athletes with EIB include racing cyclist Simon Yates, distance runner Paula Radcliffe and cross-country skier Marit Bjørgen. Research by sports scientist John Dickinson found that 70 percent of UK-based members of the British swimming team had some form of asthma, as did a third of Team Sky cyclists, compared to a national asthma rate of eight to ten percent, whilst a study by the United States Olympic Committee in 2000 found that half of cross-country skiers had EIB.
