= Mometasone =

Steroid medication

Mometasone furoate

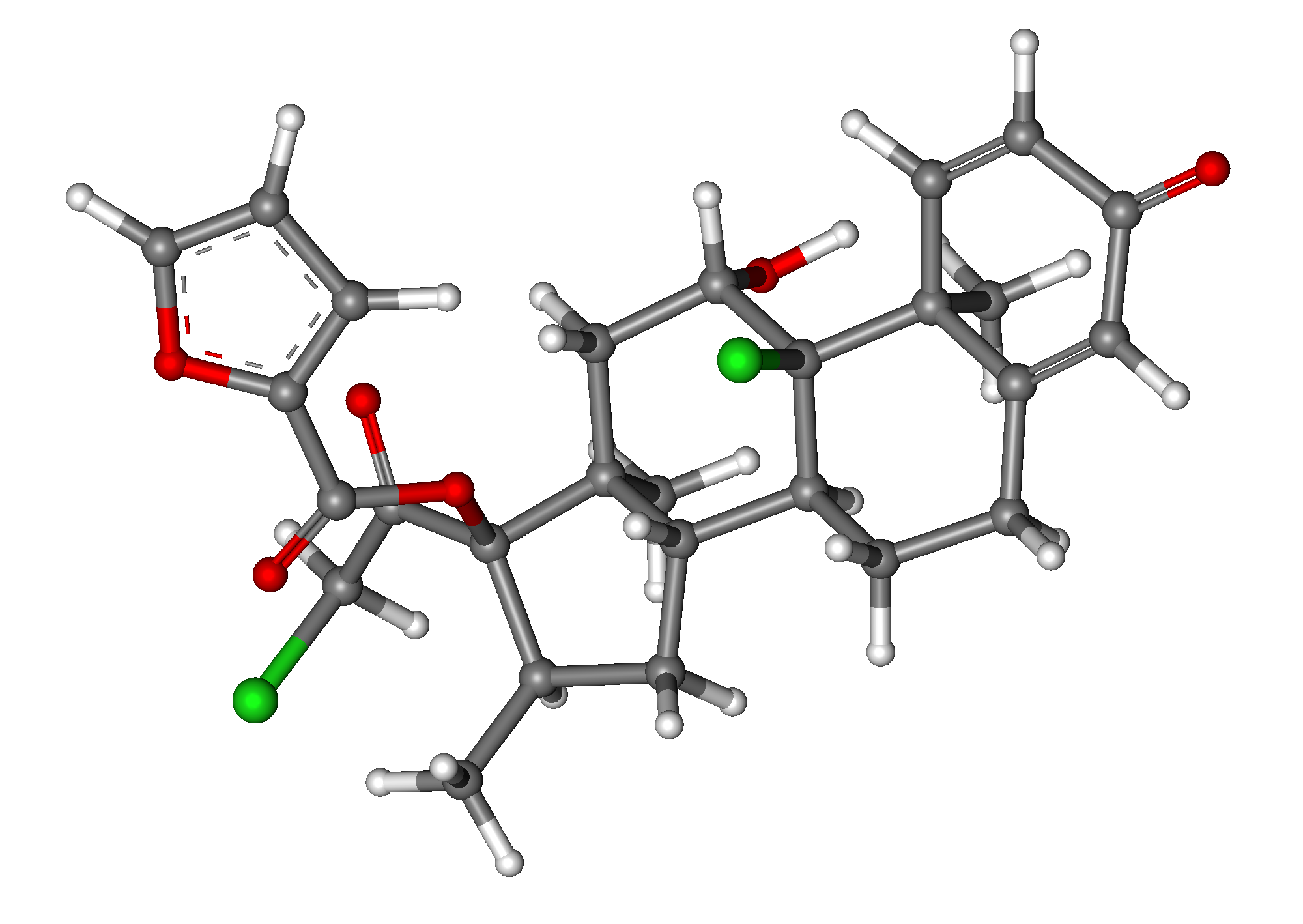

Clinical data
- Trade names: Nasonex, Asmanex, Elocon, others
- Other names: LAS-41002, 9α,21-Dichloro-11β,17α-dihydroxy-16α-methylpregna-1,4-diene-3,20-dione 17α-(2-furoate)
- AHFS/Drugs.com: Monograph
- License data: US DailyMed: Mometasone
- Pregnancy category: AU: B3
- Routes of administration: Topical, inhalation (nasal spray)
- Drug class: Corticosteroid; Glucocorticoid
- ATC code: D07AC13 (WHO) R01AD09 (WHO), R03BA07 (WHO)

Legal status
- Legal status: AU: S2 (Pharmacy medicine) / S4; CA: ℞-only; US: ℞-only / OTC; EU: Rx-only

Pharmacokinetic data
- Bioavailability: Nasal spray is virtually undetectable in plasma; but systemic availability is comparable to fluticasone
- Protein binding: 98% to 99%
- Metabolism: Liver
- Elimination half-life: 5.8 hours

Identifiers
- IUPAC name: (9R,10S,11S,13S,14S,16R,17R)-9-chloro-17-(2-chloroacetyl)-11-hydroxy-10,13,16-trimethyl-3-oxo-6,7,8,9,10,11,12,13,14,15,16,17-dodecahydro-3H-cyclopenta[a]phenanthren-17-yl furan-2-carboxylate
- CAS Number: 105102-22-5 83919-23-7
- PubChem CID: 441335; as furoate: 441336
- DrugBank: DB00764; as furoate: DB14512
- ChemSpider: 390090; as furoate: 390091
- UNII: 8HR4QJ6DW8; as furoate: 04201GDN4R
- KEGG: D08227; as furoate: D00690
- ChEBI: CHEBI:6970; as furoate: CHEBI:47564
- ChEMBL: ChEMBL1201404; as furoate: ChEMBL1161
- CompTox Dashboard (EPA): DTXSID4023333
- ECHA InfoCard: 100.125.600

Chemical and physical data
- Formula: C_{22}H_{28}Cl_{2}O_{4} for mometasone C_{27}H_{30}O_{6}Cl_{2} as furoate
- 3D model (JSmol): Interactive image; as furoate: Interactive image
- SMILES: CC1CC2C3CCC4=CC(=O)C=CC4(C3(C(CC2(C1(C(=O)CCl)O)C)O)Cl)C; as furoate: CC1CC2C3CCC4=CC(=O)C=CC4(C3(C(CC2(C1(C(=O)CCl)OC(=O)C5=CC=CO5)C)O)Cl)C
- InChI: InChI=1S/C22H28Cl2O4/c1-12-8-16-15-5-4-13-9-14(25)6-7-19(13,2)21(15,24)17(26)10-20(16,3)22(12,28)18(27)11-23/h6-7,9,12,15-17,26,28H,4-5,8,10-11H2,1-3H3/t12-,15+,16+,17+,19+,20+,21+,22+/m1/s1; Key:QLIIKPVHVRXHRI-CXSFZGCWSA-N; as furoate: InChI=1S/C27H30Cl2O6/c1-15-11-19-18-7-6-16-12-17(30)8-9-24(16,2)26(18,29)21(31)13-25(19,3)27(15,22(32)14-28)35-23(33)20-5-4-10-34-20/h4-5,8-10,12,15,18-19,21,31H,6-7,11,13-14H2,1-3H3/t15-,18+,19+,21+,24+,25+,26+,27+/m1/s1; Key:WOFMFGQZHJDGCX-ZULDAHANSA-N

Mometasone and its derivate mometasone furoate are steroids (specifically, glucocorticoids), medications used to treat certain skin conditions, hay fever, and asthma. Specifically, they are used to prevent, rather than treat, asthma attacks. They can be applied to the skin, inhaled, or used in the nose. Currently only mometasone furoate is used in medical products.

Common side effects when used for asthma include headache, sore throat, and thrush. It is therefore recommended to rinse the mouth after use. Long-term use may increase the risk for glaucoma and cataracts. Common side effects when used in the nose include upper respiratory tract infections and nose bleeds. Common side effects when applied on the skin include acne, skin atrophy, and itchiness. It works by decreasing inflammation.

Mometasone furoate was patented in 1981 and came into medical use in 1987. It is on the World Health Organization's List of Essential Medicines and is available as a generic medication. In 2023, it was the 272nd most commonly prescribed medication in the United States, with more than 800,000 prescriptions.

== Medical uses ==
Mometasone furoate is used in the treatment of inflammatory skin disorders such as eczema and psoriasis (topical form), allergic rhinitis such as hay fever (topical form), asthma (inhalation form) for patients unresponsive to less potent corticosteroids, and penile phimosis. Some low-quality evidence suggests the use of mometasone for symptomatic improvement in children with adenoid hypertrophy. In terms of steroid strength, it is more potent than hydrocortisone, and less potent than dexamethasone.

Mometasone is used to alleviate inflammation and itchiness in skin conditions that respond to treatment with glucocorticoids such as psoriasis and atopic dermatitis. Nasal mometasone is used in people over two years of age to diminish the symptoms of hay fever (seasonal allergic rhinitis) and other allergies (perennial rhinitis), including nasal congestion, discharge, pruritus, sneezing, and treat nasal polyps. Mometasone furoate can be used with formoterol for the treatment of asthma, due to its anti-inflammatory properties.

It is not useful for the common cold.

== Contraindications ==
People should not use inhaled mometasone or mometasone nasal spray if they have glaucoma, cataracts, hypersensitivity, or are allergic to any ingredient in mometasone.

Those who are using mometasone nasal or inhaled for a long period of time (e.g. more than three months) should get regular eye exams to check for glaucoma and cataracts and should take precautions to avoid infections such as taking a vitamin D supplement, staying away from those with an infection (chickenpox, measles, colds or flu, COVID-19), washing foods, hand washing and calling a family doctor at the first sign of a severe infection.

People should not use mometasone topical (skin cream) if hypersensitive or allergic to any ingredient in the skin cream.

Risks of mometasone furoate to the baby during pregnancy cannot be ruled out.

== Side effects ==
The nasal spray form of mometasone may cause the following side effects:

- fevers, chills, tiredness, nausea, vomiting, diarrhea, heartburn
- headache
- sore throat
- nose bleeds
- cough
- muscle and joint pain, increased menstrual pain
- sinus pain
- weakness
- chest pain
- red and itchy eyes
- ear pain

Serious side effects include: thrush (fungal infection in the nose or throat), slow wound healing, eye problems such as glaucoma or cataracts, growth retardation in children, weakened immune system (immunodeficiency) which causes increased susceptibility to infections and adrenal insufficiency.

The inhaled form of mometasone for asthma may cause the following side effects:

- headache
- stuffy or runny nose
- dry throat
- swelling of nose, throat and sinuses
- nose irritation or nosebleeds
- flu-like symptoms
- painful menstrual periods
- bone, muscle, joint, or back pain

Serious side effects may include allergic reactions (anaphylaxis), increased risk of osteoporosis, glaucoma and cataracts, thrush in the mouth or throat, growth retardation in children, bronchospasms, adrenal insufficiency and weakened immune system which causes increased susceptibility to infections.

The topical (skin cream) version may cause:

- burning and itching at the application site
- acne
- changes in skin color
- dryness at the application site
- skin sores

Serious side effects of topical mometasone include slowed growth in children and adrenal insufficiency.

== Pharmacology ==
=== Pharmacodynamics ===
Mometasone furoate reduces inflammation by causing several effects:

- Reversing the activation of inflammatory proteins
- Activating the secretion of anti-inflammatory proteins
- Stabilizing cell membranes
- Decreasing the influx of inflammatory cells

In addition to the glucocorticoid properties of mometasone furoate, it is a very potent agonist of the progesterone receptor as well as a partial agonist of the mineralocorticoid receptor.

==== Mechanism of action ====
Mometasone — the metabolite of mometasone furoate.

Mometasone, like other corticosteroids, possesses anti-inflammatory, antipruritic, and vasoconstrictive properties. For allergies, corticosteroids reduce the allergic reactions in various types of cells (mast cells and eosinophils) that are responsible for allergic reactions. Mometasone and other corticosteroids circulate in the blood easily, crossing cellular membranes and binding with cytoplasmic receptors, resulting in the transcription and synthesis of proteins. It also inhibits the actions of the enzyme cytochrome P450 2C8 which participates in the activity of monooxygenase.

The inflammation is reduced by decreasing the liberation of hydrolase acids of leukocytes, the prevention of the accumulation of macrophages in the sites of inflammation, the interference with the adhesion of leukocytes to capillary walls, the reduction of the permeability of the capillary membranes and consequently edema, the reduction of complementary components, inhibition of histamine and kinin liberation, and interference with scar tissue formation. The proliferation of fibroblasts and collagen deposits is also reduced. It is believed that the action of corticosteroid anti-inflammatory agents is bound to inhibitive proteins of phospholipase A2, collectively called lipocortins. The lipocortins, in turn, control the biosynthesis of potent mediators of inflammation as the prostaglandins and leukotrienes, inhibiting the liberation of the molecular precursors of arachidonic acid. Intranasal mometasone alleviates symptoms such as rhinorrhea aquosa, nasal congestion, nasal drip, sneezing, and pharyngeal itching. Topical administration applied to the skin reduces the inflammation associated with chronic or acute dermatosis.

Although mometasone furoate does not have significant systemic immunomodulatory effects, it can be considered a local immunosuppressive drug because clinical studies have shown reductions (vs. baseline) in neutrophils in the nasal mucosa. It could be also considered an antihistamine along with its glucocorticoid effects because it significantly reduces histamine and eosinophil cationic protein levels.

=== Pharmacokinetics ===
==== Metabolism ====
Extensive metabolic hepatic metabolism of mometasone furoate to multiple metabolites occurs. No principal metabolites are detectable in plasma. After in vitro incubation, one of the minor metabolites formed is furoate 6β-hydroxymometasone. In human hepatic microsomes, the formation of these metabolites is regulated by CYP3A4.

=== Mometasone ===
Mometasone by itself is a synthetic, steroidal glucocorticoid or corticosteroid that was never marketed. The C17α furoate ester of mometasone, is the marketed medication. Mometasone furoate acts as a prodrug of mometasone. In addition to its glucocorticoid activity, mometasone also has very potent progestogenic activity and acts as a partial agonist of the mineralocorticoid receptor.

== Society and culture ==
=== Availability ===
As of 2016, mometasone furoate is available worldwide in formulations for nasal, oral inhalation, and topical administration, for human and veterinary use, either as a single active agent or in combination with other medications, under many brand names.

=== Combinations ===
The following combination medications are available as of 2022:

Combination	Commercial name	Notes
azelastine	Nasaflex	
clotrimazole and gentamicin	Mometamax, Mometavet	Veterinary use
clotrimazole and mupirocin	Derma Q	
florfenicol and terbinafine	Claro	Veterinary use
formoterol	Dulera, Hexaler Bronquial Duo, Zenhale	
fusidic acid	Bactirest-M, Dermotil Fusid, Momate-F	
gentamicin and posaconazole	Mometamax Ultra	Veterinary use
hydroquinone and tretinoin	Acnezac-MH	
miconazole	Elica M, Elica-M, and Sensicort-F	
mupirocin	Sensicort-B	
orbifloxacin and posaconazole	Posatex, Posatex voor honden, Posatex für Hunde	Veterinary use
salicylic acid	Cortimax-S, Elicasal, Elocom Plus, Elosalic, Mezo-S, Momate-S, Momesalic, Momtas-S, Monsalic, Sensicort-S	
terbinafine	Cutizone-T, Mezo-T, MomelomTerbi-Humanity	
tiotropium	Tiomom	
