= Budesonide/formoterol =

Medication for asthma & chronic obstructive pulmonary disease

Combination of
- Budesonide: Glucocorticoids
- Formoterol: Long-acting beta-adrenoceptor agonist

Clinical data
- Trade names: Symbicort, others
- AHFS/Drugs.com: Professional Drug Facts
- MedlinePlus: a623022
- License data: US DailyMed: Budesonide and formoterol
- Pregnancy category: AU: B3
- Routes of administration: Inhalation
- ATC code: R03AK07 (WHO)

Legal status
- Legal status: AU: S4 (Prescription only); UK: POM (Prescription only); US: ℞-only; EU: Rx-only; In general: ℞ (Prescription only)

Pharmacokinetic data
- Onset of action: Within 1-3 minutes
- Duration of action: At least 12 hours after a single dose

Identifiers
- CAS Number: 150693-37-1
- KEGG: D09595
- CompTox Dashboard (EPA): DTXSID80872449

Budesonide/formoterol, sold under the brand name Symbicort among others, is a fixed-dose combination medication used in the management of asthma or chronic obstructive pulmonary disease (COPD). It contains budesonide, a glucocorticoid steroid; and formoterol, a long-acting β_{2}-agonist (LABA). The product monograph does not support its use for sudden worsening or treatment of active bronchospasm. However, a 2020 review of the literature does support such use. It is used by breathing in the medication.

Common (≥1/100 to <1/10) side effects include candidiasis, headache, tremor, palpitations, throat irritation, coughing, and dysphonia. Pneumonia is a common side effect in people with COPD, and other, less common side effects have been documented. There were concerns that the LABA component increases the risk of death in children with asthma, however these concerns were removed in 2017. Therefore, this combination is only recommended in those who are not controlled on an inhaled steroid alone. There is tentative evidence that typical doses of inhaled steroids and LABAs are safe in pregnancy. Both formoterol and budesonide are excreted in breast-milk.

Budesonide/formoterol was approved for medical use in the United States in 2006. It is on the World Health Organization's List of Essential Medicines. It is available as a generic medication. In 2023, it was the 74th most commonly prescribed medication in the United States, with more than 9 million prescriptions.

== Medical uses ==
Budesonide/formoterol is indicated for the treatment of asthma and for the maintenance treatment of airflow obstruction and reducing exacerbations in people with chronic obstructive pulmonary disease.

=== Maintenance ===
Budesonide/formoterol has shown efficacy to prevent asthma attacks. It is unclear if the efficacy of budesonide/formoterol differs from that of fluticasone and salmeterol in chronic asthma.

=== Exacerbation ===
The combination is approved in the United States only as a maintenance medication in asthma and chronic obstructive pulmonary disease (COPD). However, a 2020 review of the literature does support use as needed during acute worsening in those with mild disease, and as maintenance followed by extra doses during worsening.

Use for both maintenance and as-needed treatment is also known as single maintenance and reliever therapy (SMART) and is a well-established treatment. It has been shown to, 1) reduce asthma exacerbations that require oral corticosteroids, 2) reduce hospital visits better than maintenance on inhaled corticosteroids alone at a higher dose, or 3) inhaled corticosteroid at the same or higher dose together with a long-acting bronchodilator (LABA), with a short-acting bronchodilator (SABA) as a reliever.

== Side effects ==
=== Common (up to 1 in 10 people) ===
- Mild throat irritation
- Coughing
- Hoarseness
- Oral candidiasis (thrush. significantly less likely if the patient rinses their mouth out with water after inhalations)
- Headache

Often mild, and usually disappear as the medication continues to be used:

- Heart palpitations
- Trembling

=== Uncommon (up to 1 in 100 people) ===
- Feeling restlessness, nervous, or agitated
- Disturbed sleep
- Feeling dizzy
- Nausea
- Tachycardia (fast heart rate)
- Bruising of the skin
- Muscle cramps

=== Rare (up to 1 in 1,000 people) ===
- Rash
- Itchiness
- Bronchospasm (tightening of the muscles in the airways causing wheezing immediately after use of the medication, which is possibly sign of an allergic reaction and should be met with immediate medical attention)
- Hypokalemia (low levels of potassium in the blood)
- Heart arrhythmia

=== Very rare (up to 1 in 10,000 people) ===
- Depression
- Changes in behaviour, especially in children
- Chest pain or tightness in chest
- Increase in blood glucose levels
- Taste changes, such as an unpleasant taste in the mouth
- Changes in blood pressure

=== Other ===
With high doses for a long period of time.

- Reduced bone mineral density, causing osteoporosis
- Cataracts
- Glaucoma
- Slowed rate of growth in children and adolescents
- Dysfunction of the adrenal gland, which affects the production of various hormones

=== Allergic reaction ===
- Angioedema (swelling of the face, mouth, tongue, and/or throat. Difficulty swallowing. Hives. Difficulty breathing. Feeling of faintness)
- Bronchospasm (sudden acute wheezing or shortness of breath immediately after use of medication. The patient should use their reliever medication immediately.)

== Society and culture ==
=== Legal status ===
Budesonide/formoterol was approved for use in the United States in July 2006.

There are several patents related to the drug; some of which have expired. It was initially marketed by AstraZeneca.

== Brand names ==
It is sold under various brand names including Symbicort, BiResp Spiromax, and DuoResp Spiromax.
