= Exercise-induced laryngeal obstruction =

Laryngeal narrowing during exercise

Exercise-induced laryngeal obstruction (EILO) is a transient, reversible narrowing of the larynx during high-intensity exercise. This acts to impair airflow and cause shortness of breath, stridor, and often discomfort in the throat and upper chest. EILO is a prevalent cause of breathing difficulties in young athletic individuals, but is often misdiagnosed as asthma or exercise-induced bronchoconstriction.

== Causes ==
EILO may arise because of a relative mechanical 'insufficiency' of the laryngeal structures that should act to maintain glottic patency. It has been proposed that a narrowing at the laryngeal inlet during the state of high airflow (e.g., when running fast) can cause a pressure drop across the larynx, which then pulls' the laryngeal structures together. The Bernoulli principle states that increasing airflow through a tube creates increasing negative pressures within that tube. Complex neuromuscular functioning is required to maintain laryngeal opening and allow the larynx to achieve many tasks (i.e., speaking, airway protection, swallowing). Thus, EILO may also arise as a form of neuromuscular failure.

A small heredity study indicated that an autosomal dominant model of inheritance with variable expressivity and reduced penetrance in males may be relevant, because in ten families studied, there was at least one affected person in every generation in which both parents were examined.

Further work is needed to determine if structural deficiencies in the laryngeal tissue of individuals with EILO are present.

== Mechanism ==
A narrowing of the supraglottic structures of the larynx typically causes EILO. In severe cases, these structures, called arytenoids, can almost completely close the laryngeal inlet.

In fewer cases, the glottic (i.e., vocal cord) structures close together,, typically during exercise-induced vocal-cord dysfunction.

EILO develops during intense exercise, and closure develops as exercise becomes more intense.

Closure of the voice box during exercise causes increased 'loading' on the breathing system, and the respiratory muscles must work much harder.

== Epidemiology ==
The prevalence of EILO in adolescents and young adults appears to be 5–7% in northern Europe, with some indication that EILO may be more prevalent in highly trained athletes.

Some, but not all, studies report a higher female prevalence. Thus, in a study of 94 patients diagnosed using the CLE test, the average age was ~15 years, and 68% were female.

EILO appears to be a highly prevalent cause of cough and wheeze in athletic individuals and can co-exist with EIB. In one study, of almost 90 athletes with unexplained respiratory symptoms, EILO was present in approximately 30% of athletes, whilst EILO and EIB co-existed in one in ten.

This condition can co-exist with other conditions, including severe asthma.

== Clinical features ==
- Key clinical features often include:
  - Difficulty 'catching a breath'
  - Wheeze or whistling sound; typically when breathing in while exercising hard.
  - Throat or upper chest discomfort
- Symptoms often start to improve from the time of exercise cessation / reducing exercise intensity.
- No improvement with standard asthma medication (e.g., salbutamol, albuterol).

== Diagnosis ==
The gold standard for diagnosing EILO is continuous laryngoscopy during exercise tests (CLE-tests). This test involves the placement of a flexible laryngoscope via the nostril, which is then secured in place and held with headgear. It allows continuous visualization of the laryngeal aperture during exercise. The CLE test can be used during indoor treadmill or cycle-ergometer exercise, while rowing or swimming or exercising outdoors.

The examiner visually evaluates the patient's relative change of the laryngeal inlet throughout the CLE-test. One standard grading system uses four steps (0-3) on the glottic and supraglottic levels, respectively. Grades 0-1 are considered normal, whereas grades 2-3 on either or both levels are consistent with EILO. There is a need to identify other less invasive means of making a secure diagnosis.

== Treatment ==
The current mainstay of treatment is therapy-based. Specialist breathing techniques, most commonly termed biphasic breathing techniques or EILOBI, are recommended to reduce turbulent inspiratory airflow and thus reduce the chance of laryngeal closure.

Direct laryngeal visualization during exercise to deliver biofeedback has been employed with success.

The place of inspiratory muscle training (IMT) is yet to be defined in EILO therapy.

Surgical treatment with supraglottoplasty has also been utilized with success.

Avoiding unnecessary treatment with asthma inhalers is important.
