= Beclometasone/formoterol =

Inhalable drug

Combination of
- Beclometasone dipropionate: Glucocorticoid
- Formoterol fumarate: Long-acting β_{2} agonist

Clinical data
- Trade names: Fostair, Luforbec, Proxor, others
- AHFS/Drugs.com: International Drug Names
- Routes of administration: Inhalation
- ATC code: R03AL09 (WHO)

Legal status
- Legal status: AU: S4 (Prescription only); UK: POM (Prescription only)

Beclometasone/formoterol, sold under the brand name Fostair, Luforbec and Proxor, among others, is an inhalable fixed-dose combination drug for the treatment of asthma and chronic obstructive pulmonary disease (COPD). It contains beclometasone dipropionate and formoterol fumarate dihydrate. It is inhaled.

It was approved for medical use in the United Kingdom in 2007, and in Australia in February 2020. It is on the World Health Organization's List of Essential Medicines.
