= Ipratropium bromide/salbutamol =

Combination drug

Combination of
- Ipratropium bromide: Muscarinic antagonist
- Salbutamol: Short-acting β2-adrenergic agonist

Clinical data
- Trade names: Combivent, others
- AHFS/Drugs.com: Professional Drug Facts
- MedlinePlus: a601063
- License data: US DailyMed: Ipratropium bromide and albuterol
- Routes of administration: Inhalation
- ATC code: R03AK04 (WHO)

Legal status
- Legal status: AU: S3 (Pharmacist only); UK: POM (Prescription only); US: ℞-only

Identifiers
- CAS Number: 1031840-23-9

Ipratropium bromide/salbutamol, sold under the brand name Combivent among others, is a combination medication used to treat chronic obstructive pulmonary disease (COPD). It contains ipratropium bromide (an anticholinergic) and salbutamol (albuterol, a β_{2}-adrenergic agonist).

Common side effects include sore throat, muscle cramps, and nausea. Other side effects may include bronchospasm, allergic reactions, and upper respiratory tract infections. Safety in pregnancy is unclear.

The combination was approved for medical use in the United States in 1996. It is available as a generic medication. In 2023, it was the 181st most commonly prescribed medication in the United States, with more than 2 million prescriptions.

== Medical uses ==
Ipratropium bromide/salbutamol can be used for the treatment of COPD and asthma.
