= Aclidinium bromide/formoterol =

Drug combination used to manage Chronic Obstructive Pulmonary Disease (COPD)

Combination of
- Aclidinium bromide: Long-acting muscarinic antagonist
- Formoterol: Long-acting β_{2} agonist

Clinical data
- Trade names: Brimica Genuair, Duaklir Genuair, Duaklir Pressair
- AHFS/Drugs.com: Professional Drug Facts
- License data: US DailyMed: Duaklir
- Pregnancy category: AU: B3
- Routes of administration: Inhalation
- ATC code: R03AL05 (WHO)

Legal status
- Legal status: AU: S4 (Prescription only); UK: POM (Prescription only); US: ℞-only; EU: Rx-only; In general: ℞ (Prescription only)

Identifiers
- CAS Number: 2446159-07-3
- KEGG: D11857

Aclidinium bromide/formoterol, sold under the brand names Duaklir and Brimica, is a fixed-dose combination medication for inhalation, used in the management of chronic obstructive pulmonary disease (COPD). It consists of aclidinium bromide, a long-acting muscarinic antagonist, and formoterol, a long-acting β_{2} agonist.
