= Bronchoconstriction =

Constriction of the terminal airways in the lungs

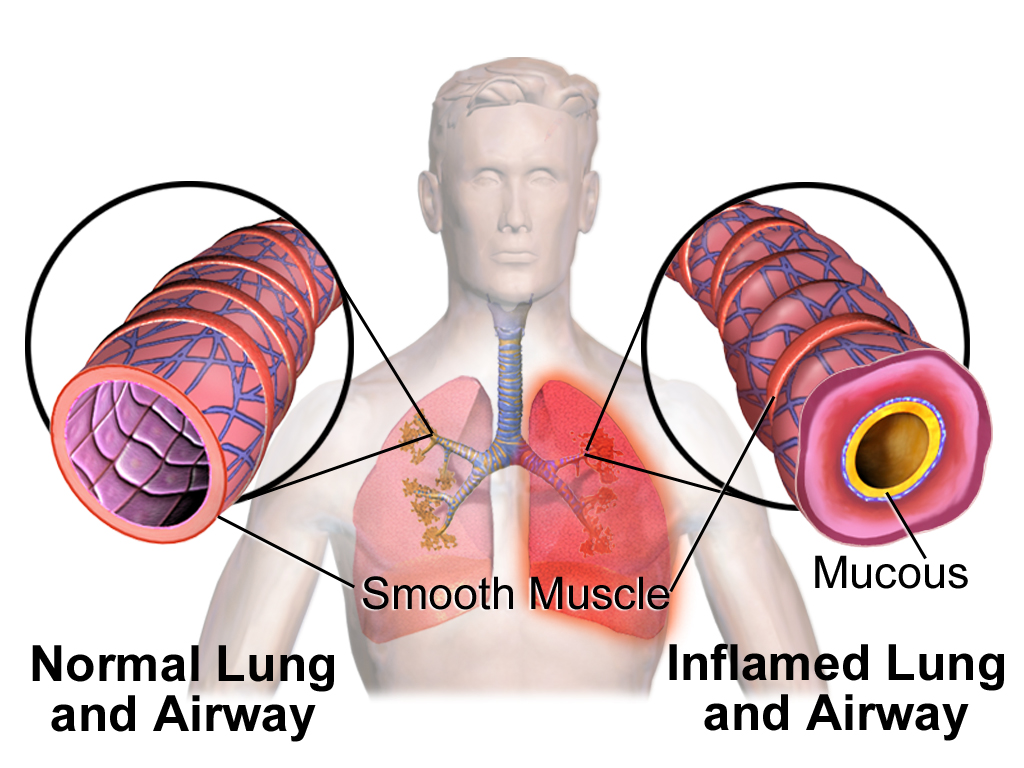
Illustration depicting bronchoconstriction (Asthma)

Bronchoconstriction is the feeling of constriction in the lungs and airways due to the tightening of surrounding smooth muscle, with consequent coughing, wheezing, and shortness of breath.

== Causes ==
The condition has a number of causes, the most common being emphysema as well as asthma. Exercise and allergies can bring on the symptoms in an otherwise asymptomatic individual.

=== Emphysema ===
With emphysema the shortness of breath due to effective bronchoconstriction from excessive very thick mucus blockage (it is so thick that great difficulty is encountered in expelling it resulting in near exhaustion at times) can bring on panic attacks unless the individual expects this and has effectively learned pursed lip breathing to more quickly transfer oxygen to the blood via the damaged alveoli resulting from the disease. The most common cause of emphysema is smoking and smoking cessation is mandatory if this incurable disease is to be treated. Prevention of bronchoconstriction by this pathway is vital for people with emphysema and there are several anticholinergic medications that in combination with mucous thinning agents such as Guaifenesin cause significant improvement in breathing.

=== Exercise-induced bronchoconstriction ===
More generally termed exercise-induced asthma, the preferred and more accurate term exercise-induced bronchoconstriction better reflects underlying pathophysiology. It is also preferred due to the former term giving the false impression that asthma is caused by exercise.

In a patient with EIB, exercise initially follows the normal patterns of bronchodilation. However, by three minutes, the constriction sets in, which peaks at around 10–15 minutes, and usually resolves itself by an hour. During an episode of this type of bronchoconstriction, the levels of inflammatory mediators, particularly leukotrienes, histamine, and interleukin, increase. TH2-type lymphocytes are activated, with an increase in T cells expressing CD25 (IL-2R), and B cells expressing CD 23, causing increased production of IgE. After exercise, the conditions will fade within one to three minutes. In most people with EIB, this is followed by a refractory period, of generally less than four hours, during which if exercise is repeated, the bronchoconstriction is less emphasised. This is probably caused by the release of prostaglandins.

The underlying cause of this type of bronchoconstriction appear to be the large volume of cool, dry air inhaled during strenuous exercise. The condition appears to improve when the air inhaled is more fully humidified and closer to body temperature.

This specific condition, in the general population, can vary between 7 and 20 percent. This increases to around 80 percent in those with symptomatic asthma. In many cases, however, the constriction, even during or after strenuous exercise, is not clinically significant except in cases of severe to moderate emphysema.

In May 2013, the American Thoracic Society issued the first treatment guidelines for EIB.

=== Allergen-induced bronchoconstriction ===
While a different cause, this has very similar symptoms, namely the immunological reaction involving release of inflammatory mediators.

Inhalation of allergens in sensitized subjects develops into bronchoconstriction within 10 minutes, reaches a maximum within 30 minutes, and usually resolves itself within one to three hours. In some subjects, the constriction does not return to normal, and recurs after three to four hours, which may last up to a day or more. The first is named the early asthmatic response, and the latter the late asthmatic response.

Bronchoconstriction can occur as a result of anaphylaxis, even when the allergen is not inhaled.

== Physiology ==
Bronchoconstriction is defined as the narrowing of the airways in the lungs (bronchi and bronchioles). Air flow in air passages can get restricted in three ways:

1. a spasmodic state of the smooth muscles in bronchi and bronchioles
2. an inflammation in the middle layers of the bronchi and bronchioles
3. excessive production of mucus.

The bronchial spasm is due to the activation of parasympathetic nervous system. Postganglionic parasympathetic fibers will release acetylcholine causing the constriction of the smooth muscle layer surrounding the bronchi. These smooth muscle cells have muscarinic M_{3} receptors on their membrane. The activation of these receptors by acetylcholine will activate an intracellular G protein, that in turn will activate the phospholipase C pathway, that will end in an increase of intracellular calcium concentrations and therefore contraction of the smooth muscle cell. The muscle contraction will cause the diameter of the bronchus to decrease, therefore increasing its resistance to airflow.

Bronchoconstriction is common in people with respiratory problems, such as asthma, COPD, and cystic fibrosis.

== Management ==
Medical management of transient bronchoconstriction or chronic bronchitis depends on the severity and etiology of the underlying disease and can be treated with combinations of the following medications:

- B-receptor agonists: Medications that stimulate the β2 receptor subtype on pulmonary smooth muscle will result in smooth muscle relaxation, bronchodilation, and increased airflow into the lungs during inhalation. These medications include short-acting beta agonists (SABAs) such as albuterol which typically last 4–6 hours, and long-acting beta agonists (LABAs) such as salmeterol which lasts 12 hours. For example, during an acute asthma exacerbation where airway smooth muscle is constricted, inhalation of SABAs provide rapid relief of symptoms—within 5–15 minutes—and are typically called "rescue inhalers". Due to their fast onset of action, they have been selected as first-line therapy for quick relief in persistent and intermittent asthma and bronchospasm. Patients may experience dizziness, heart palpitations, hyperglycemia, diarrhea and muscle cramps when taking these medications. Importantly, medications that antagonize the β2 receptor (β-blockers) may significantly increase the risk of asthma exacerbations, and are generally avoided in asthmatic patients.
- Corticosteroids: Inhaled corticosteroids (e.g. fluticasone, budesonide) are typically used when bronchoconstrictive disease has advanced to a persistent inflammatory state, more specifically in persistent or severe asthma and chronic obstructive pulmonary disease (COPD). These medications decrease immune system activity which in turn will decrease swelling of the airways, decrease airway resistance, and increase delivery of air to the alveoli during respiration. Unlike the SABAs, these medications do not provide relief of acute symptoms or asthmatic attacks, and their benefits are typically only seen after 3–4 weeks of therapy. Due to this delayed therapeutic response, it is essential that patients who are prescribed corticosteroids for respiratory disease are adherent to their medication regimen. In the ISOLDE trial, fluticasone therapy decreased the frequency of COPD exacerbations and the rate of health decline in patients with moderate-to-severe COPD; however, had little effect in decreasing the rate of FEV1 decline. Patients should be counseled to wash their mouth following use of inhaled corticosteroids to decrease the risk of developing oral thrush, a common side effect of these medications.
- Muscarinic antagonists (anti-cholinergics): Blocking the muscarinic acetylcholine receptors in pulmonary smooth muscle tissue results in a decrease in smooth muscle tone and bronchodilation. These medications include short-acting muscarinic antagonists (SAMAs) such as ipratropium, and long-acting muscarinic antagonists (LAMA) such as tiotropium. Onset of action for SAMAs is typically between 30 and 60 minutes, making these drugs less efficacious in treating acute asthma attacks and bronchospasm. Most common side effects for these drugs may include dry mouth, headache, urinary tract infection, and bronchitis.
- Other: Other prescription and over-the-counter medications, such as theophylline, cromolyn, and montelukast are indicated for specific diseases and may only provide bronchoconstriction relief to these studied populations.

== See also ==
- Bronchodilatation
- Bronchospasm
