= Formoterol =

Long-acting bronchiodilator

- Formoterol molecular structure

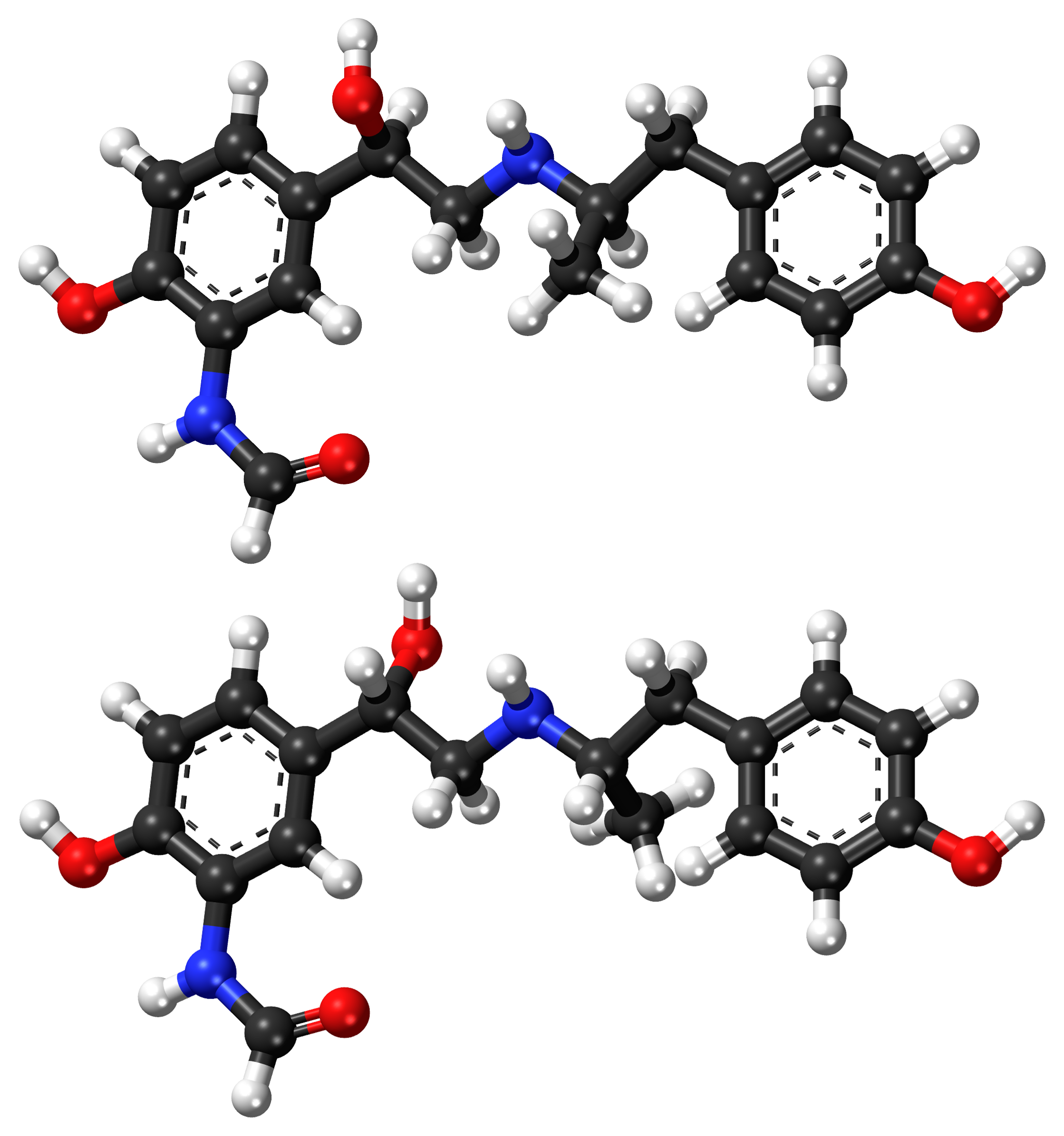
- Above (R,R)-(−)-formoterol; Below (S,S)-(+)-formoterol

Clinical data
- Trade names: Oxeze, Foradil, Symbicort, others
- AHFS/Drugs.com: Monograph
- License data: EU EMA: by formoterol fumarate dihydrate
- Pregnancy category: AU: B3
- Routes of administration: Inhalation (capsules for oral inhalation, DPI, MDI)
- ATC code: R03AC13 (WHO) R03CC15 (WHO)

Legal status
- Legal status: AU: S4 (Prescription only); NZ: Prescription only; UK: POM (Prescription only); US: ℞-only; EU: Rx-only; In general: ℞ (Prescription only)

Pharmacokinetic data
- Protein binding: 61% to 64%
- Metabolism: Liver demethylation and glucuronidation (CYP2D6, CYP2C19, CYP2C9 and CYP2A6 involved)
- Elimination half-life: 10 h
- Excretion: Kidney and fecal

Identifiers
- IUPAC name: (RR,SS)-N-[2-hydroxy-5-[1-hydroxy-2-[1-(4-methoxyphenyl) propan-2-ylamino]ethyl] phenyl]formamide
- CAS Number: 73573-87-2
- PubChem CID: 3083544; 3034756
- IUPHAR/BPS: 3465
- DrugBank: DB00983
- ChemSpider: 2340731
- UNII: 5ZZ84GCW8B
- KEGG: D07990
- ChEBI: CHEBI:408174
- ChEMBL: ChEMBL1363
- CompTox Dashboard (EPA): DTXSID20860603 DTXSID1023077, DTXSID20860603
- ECHA InfoCard: 100.131.654

Chemical and physical data
- Formula: C_{19}H_{24}N_{2}O_{4}
- Molar mass: 344.411 g·mol^{−1}
- 3D model (JSmol): Interactive image
- Chirality: Racemic mixture
- SMILES: O=CNc1cc(ccc1O)[C@@H](O)CN[C@H](C)Cc2ccc(OC)cc2
- InChI: InChI=1S/C19H24N2O4/c1-13(9-14-3-6-16(25-2)7-4-14)20-11-19(24)15-5-8-18(23)17(10-15)21-12-22/h3-8,10,12-13,19-20,23-24H,9,11H2,1-2H3,(H,21,22)/t13-,19+/m1/s1; Key:BPZSYCZIITTYBL-YJYMSZOUSA-N

Formoterol, also known as eformoterol, is a long-acting β_{2} agonist (LABA) used as a bronchodilator in the management of asthma and chronic obstructive pulmonary disease (COPD). Formoterol has an extended duration of action (up to 12 h) compared to short-acting β_{2} agonists such as salbutamol (albuterol), which are effective for 4 h to 6 h. Formoterol has a relatively rapid onset of action compared to other LABAs, and is effective within 2-3 minutes. The 2022 Global Initiative for Asthma report recommends a combination formoterol/inhaled corticosteroid inhaler as both a preventer and reliever treatment for asthma in adults. In children, a short-acting β_{2} adrenergic agonist (e.g., salbutamol) is still recommended.

It was patented in 1972 and came into medical use in 1998. It is available as a generic medication. It is also marketed in the combination formulations budesonide/formoterol and mometasone/formoterol.

== Side effects ==
In November 2005, the US Food and Drug Administration (FDA) released a health advisory alerting the public to findings that show the use of long-acting β_{2} agonists could lead to a worsening of wheezing symptoms in some patients.

Nowadays, available long-acting β_{2} agonists include salmeterol, formoterol, bambuterol, and sustained-release oral salbutamol.

Combinations of inhaled steroids and long-acting bronchodilators are becoming more widespread – combination preparations include fluticasone/salmeterol and budesonide/formoterol.

== Mechanism of action ==
Inhaled formoterol works like other β_{2} agonists, causing bronchodilation by relaxing the smooth muscle in the airway so as to treat the exacerbation of asthma. It has also been reported to target tubulin, favorizing its polymerization.

== Society and culture ==
=== Brand names ===
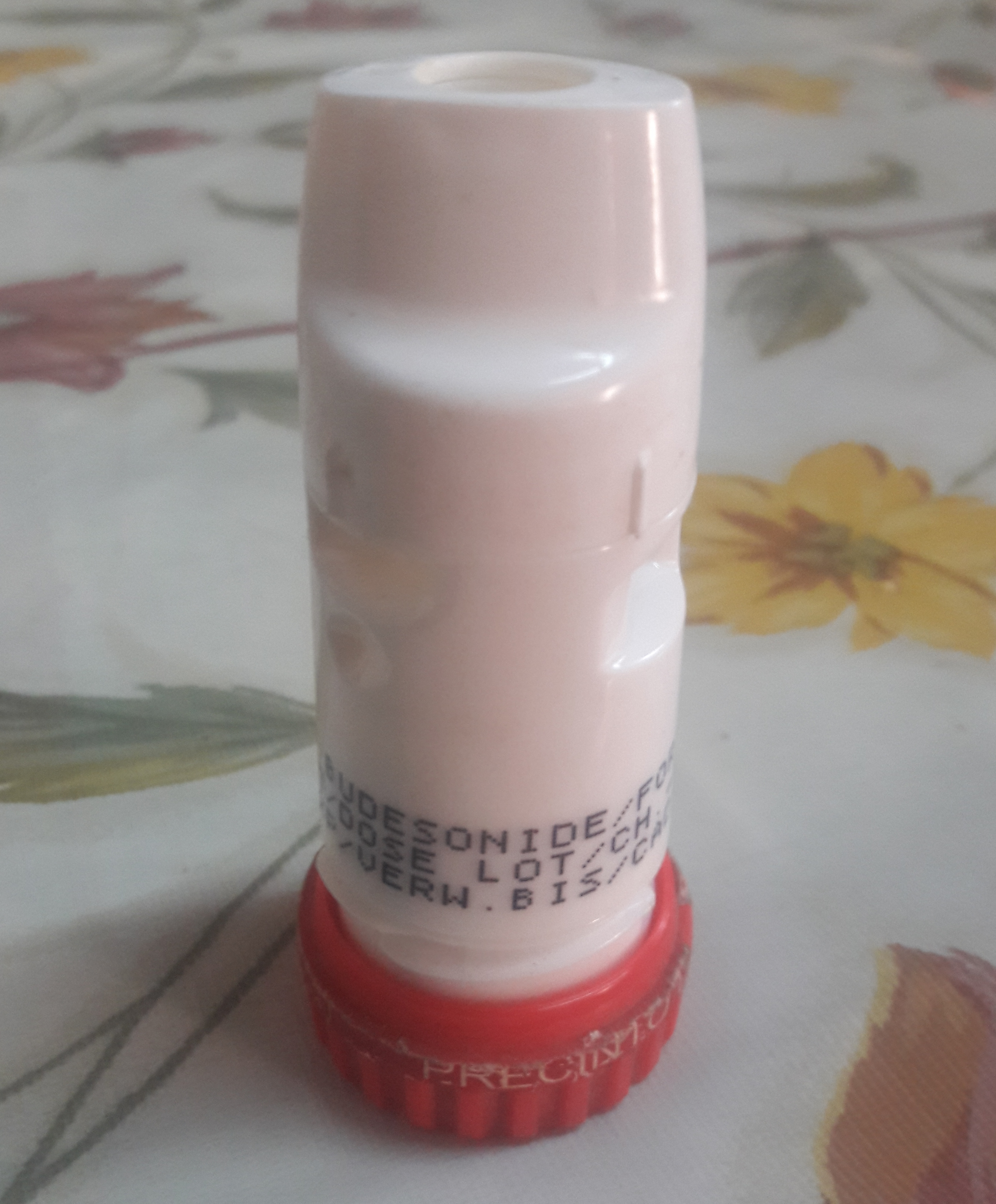
Inhaler for a powder based in budesonide and formoterol

Formoterol is marketed in three forms: a dry-powder inhaler (DPI), a metered-dose inhaler (MDI) and an inhalation solution, under various brand names including Atock, Atimos/Atimos Modulite, Foradil/Foradile, Fostair, Oxeze/Oxis, Perforomist and Symbicort.

- Foradil/Foradile capsules for oral inhalation (Schering-Plough in the U.S., Novartis rest of world)
- Oxeze/Oxis Turbuhaler dry-powder inhaler (DPI) (AstraZeneca)
- Atock (Astellas)
- Atimos/Atimos Modulite metered-dose inhaler (MDI) (Chiesi)
- Perforomist inhalation solution (Mylan N.V.)
- Symbicort Turbuhaler dry-powder inhaler (DPI) (AstraZeneca)

In some countries, Perforomist is marketed by Viatris after Upjohn merged with Mylan to create Viatris.

== Uses and combinations ==
- Arformoterol ((R,R)-(−)-formoterol) — an enantiopure compound used in the management of COPD
- Combination drugs:
  - Aclidinium bromide/formoterol
  - Beclometasone/formoterol
  - Budesonide/formoterol
  - Mometasone furoate/formoterol
