= Bronchospasm =

Lower respiratory tract disease that affects the airways leading into the lungs

- Inflamed airways and bronchoconstriction in asthma. Airways narrowed as a result of the inflammatory response cause wheezing.
- Specialty: Pulmonology

Bronchospasm or a bronchial spasm is a sudden constriction of the muscles in the walls of the bronchioles. It is caused by the release (degranulation) of substances from mast cells or basophils under the influence of anaphylatoxins. It causes difficulty in breathing which ranges from mild to severe.

Bronchospasms occur in asthma, chronic bronchitis and anaphylaxis. Bronchospasms are a possible side effect of some drugs: pilocarpine, beta blockers (used to treat hypertension), a paradoxical result of using LABA drugs (to treat COPD), and other drugs. Bronchospasms can present as a sign of giardiasis.

Some factors that contribute to bronchospasm include consuming certain foods, taking certain medicines, allergic responses to insects, and fluctuating hormone levels, particularly in women. Bronchospasms are one of several conditions associated with cold housing.

The overactivity of the bronchioles' muscle is a result of exposure to a stimulus which under normal circumstances would cause little or no response. The resulting constriction and inflammation causes a narrowing of the airways and an increase in mucus production; this reduces the amount of oxygen that is available to the individual causing breathlessness, coughing and hypoxia.

Bronchospasms are a serious potential complication of placing a breathing tube during general anesthesia. When the airways spasm or constrict in response to the irritating stimulus of the breathing tube, it is difficult to maintain the airway and the patient can become apneic. During general anesthesia, signs of bronchospasm include wheezing, high peak inspiratory pressures, increased intrinsic PEEP, decreased expiratory tidal volumes, and an upsloping capnograph (obstructive pattern). In severe cases, there may be complete inability to ventilate and loss of ETCO2 as well as hypoxia and oxygen desaturation.

== Cause ==
Bronchospasms can occur for a number of reasons. Lower respiratory tract conditions such as asthma, chronic obstructive pulmonary disease (COPD), and emphysema can result in contraction of the airways. Other causes are side effects of topical decongestants such as oxymetazoline and phenylephrine. Both of these medications activate alpha-1 adrenergic receptors that result in smooth muscle constriction. Non-selective beta blockers are known to facilitate bronchospasm as well. Beta blockers bind to the beta-2 adrenergic receptors and block the action of epinephrine and norepinephrine causing shortness of breath.

Additionally, the pediatric population is more susceptible to disease and complications from bronchospasm due to their airway diameter being smaller.

== Diagnosis ==
Signs and symptoms:

- Wheezing
- Diminished breath sounds
- Prolonged expiration
- Increase airway pressures (in ventilated patients)

== Treatment ==
=== Beta 2 agonists ===
Beta2-adrenergic agonists are recommended for bronchospasm.

- Short acting bronchodilators (SABA)
  - Terbutaline
  - Salbutamol
  - Levosalbutamol
- Long acting bronchodilators (LABA)
  - Formoterol
  - Salmeterol
- Others
  - Epinephrine - titrate to effect (e.g. 10-50 mcg IV), especially in setting of hemodynamic compromise
  - increasing anesthetic depth
  - IV magnesium
  - Increase FiO2 to 100% and consider manual ventilation

=== Muscarinic Acetylcholine receptor antagonist ===
The neurotransmitter acetylcholine is known to decrease sympathetic response by slowing the heart rate and constricting the smooth muscle tissue. Ongoing research and successful clinical trials have shown that agents such as diphenhydramine, atropine and ipratropium bromide (all of which act as receptor antagonists of muscarinic acetylcholine receptors) are effective for treating asthma and COPD-related symptoms.

== See also ==
- Bronchoconstriction
- Bronchodilation
- Wheezing
