= List of GSK plc products =

This is a list of products manufactured by the multinational pharmaceutical, biologics, and vaccines manufacturing company GSK.

== Pharmaceutical products ==
- Adartrel (ropinirole hydrochloride)
- Advair (salmeterol, fluticasone propionate)
- Altabax (retapamulin ointment)
- Altargo (retapamulin)
- Amerge (naratriptan)
- Amoxil (amoxicillin)
- Anectine (suxamethonium chloride)
- Anoro Ellipta (umeclidinium and vilanterol)
- Arnuity Ellipta (fluticasone furoate)
- Augmentin (amoxicillin/clavulanate potassium)
- Avamys (fluticasone furoate)
- Avodart (dutasteride)
- Bactroban (mupirocin)
- Becotide (beclomethasone dipropionate)
- Benlysta (belimumab)
- Betnovate (betamethasone valerate)
- Blenrep (belantamab mafodotin)
- Blujepa (gepotidacin)
- Breo (fluticasone furoate, vilanterol)
- Ceftin (cefuroxime axetil)
- Combodart (dutasteride / tamsulosin hydrochloride)
- Cutivate (fluticasone propionate)
- Daraprim (pyrimethamine)
- Dectova (zanamivir)
- Dermovate (clobetasol propionate)
- Duodart (dutasteride tamsulosin hydrochloride)
- Duvroq (daprodustat)
- Dyazide (hydrochlorothiazide/triamterene)
- Eskazole (albendazole)
- Eumovate (clobetasone butyrate)
- Exdensur (depemokimab)
- Flixonase (fluticasone propionate)
- Flixotide (fluticasone propionate)
- Flolan (epoprostenol)
- Flonase (fluticasone propionate)
- Flovent (fluticasone propionate)
- Fortum (ceftazidime)
- Halfan (halofantrine)
- Hepsera (adefovir dipivoxil) (select markets)
- Imigran (sumatriptan succinate)
- Imitrex (sumatriptan succinate)
- Incruse Ellipta (umeclidinium)
- Integrilin (eptifibatide) (Europe)
- Jalyn (dutasteride-tamsulosin hydrochloride)
- Jemperli (dostarlimab)
- Jesduvroq (daprodustat)
- Jideytro (zidesamtinib)
- Lacipil (lacidipine)
- Lamictal (lamotrigine)
- Levitra (vardenafil HCI)
- Lynavoy (linerixibat)
- Malarone (atovaquone and proguanil hydrochloride)
- Mepron (atovaquone)
- Mivacron (mivacurium chloride)
- Naramig (naratriptan hydrochloride)
- Nimbex (cisatracurium besilate)
- Nucala (mepolizumab)
- Ojjaara (momelotinib)
- Otosporin ear drops (polymyxin B sulphate, neomycin sulfate, hydrocortisone)
- Paxil (paroxetine hydrochloride)
- Pentostam (sodium stibogluconate)
- Relenza (zanamivir)
- Relvar Ellipta (fluticasone furoate/vilanterol)
- Requip (ropinirole hydrochloride)
- Respontin nebules (ipratropium bromide)
- Rythmol (propafenone hydrochloride)
- Rythmol SR (propafenone hydrochloride)
- Seretide (salmeterol xinafoate, fluticasone propionate)
- Serevent (salmeterol xinafoate)
- Seroxat (paroxetine hydrochloride)
- Staxyn (vardenafil hydrochloride)
- Tracrium (atracurium besilate)
- Trelegy Ellipta (fluticasone furoate, umeclidinium, and vilanterol inhalation powder)
- Treximet (sumatriptan and naproxen sodium)
- Trimovate (clobetasone butyrate)
- Ultiva (remifentanil hydrochloride)
- Valtrex (valaciclovir hydrochloride)
- Ventolin (salbutamol sulfate)
- Ventolin Expectorant (salbutamol sulfate/guaifenesin)
- Ventolin HFA (albuterol)
- Veramyst (fluticasone furoate)
- Volibris (ambrisentan)
- Wellbutrin (bupropion hydrochloride)
- Wellvone (atovaquone)
- Zantac (ranitidine hydrochloride)
- Zeffix (lamivudine)
- Zejula (niraparib)
- Zentel (albendazole)
- Zinacef (cefuroxime)
- Zinnat (cefuroxime axetil)
- Zovirax (aciclovir)
- Zyban (bupropion hydrochloride)

== Vaccines ==
- Ambirix (for hepatitis A (inactivated) and hepatitis B (rDNA) (HAB) vaccine (adsorbed))
- Arexvy (for RSV)
- Bexsero (for meningitis B)
- Boostrix (for tetanus toxoid, reduced diphtheria toxoid and acellular pertussis vaccine, adsorbed)
- Cervarix (human Papillomavirus vaccine (types 16, 18) - recombinant, adjuvanted, adsorbed)
- Encepur (for tick-borne encephalitis)
- Engerix-B (for hepatitis B Vaccine (Recombinant))
- Fendrix (hepatitis B (rDNA) vaccine (adjuvanted, adsorbed))
- Fluarix (trivalent) & Fluarix (quadrivalent) (seasonal influenza vaccine (3 strain and 4 strain))
- FluLaval (trivalent) & FluLaval (quadrivalent) (seasonal influenza vaccine (3 strain and 4 strain))
- Havrix (for hepatitis A vaccine, inactivated)
- Hepatyrix (for hepatitis A (inactivated, adsorbed) and Typhoid Polysaccharide vaccine)
- Hiberix (for haemophilus B conjugate vaccine (tetanus toxoid conjugate))
- Infanrix (for diphtheria and tetanus toxoids and acellular pertussis vaccine adsorbed)
- Infanrix IPV (for diphtheria, tetanus, pertussis (acellular, component) and poliomyelitis (inactivated) vaccine (adsorbed))
- Kinrix (for diphtheria and tetanus toxoids and acellular pertussis adsorbed and inactivated poliovirus vaccine)
- Menhibrix (meningococcal groups C and Y and haemophilus b tetanus toxoid conjugate vaccine)
- Menitorix (combined Haemophilus influenzae type b and Neisseria meningitidis group C (Hib-MenC) conjugate vaccines)
- Menjugate (for meningitis C)
- Menveo (for meningitis ACWY)
- Pandemrix (for influenza vaccine (split virion, inactivated))
- Pediarix (for diphtheria and tetanus toxoids and acellular pertussis adsorbed, hepatitis B (recombinant) and inactivated poliovirus vaccine combined)
- Priorix (for measles, mumps and rubella vaccine (live attenuated virus))
- Priorix tetra (for measles, mumps, rubella, varicella (chicken pox))
- Quinvaxem (for dipheria, Tetanus, whole-cell Pertussis– HiB – HepB)
- Rabipur (for rabies)
- Rotarix (human rotavirus vaccine, live attenuated)
- Shingrix (for Zoster Vaccine Recombinant, Adjuvanted)
- Synflorix (pneumococcal polysaccharide conjugate vaccine (adsorbed))
- Twinrix (for combined hepatitis A (inactivated virus) and hepatitis B vaccine (genetically derived surface antigen))
- Typherix (typhoid vaccine (purified polysaccharide antigen))
- Varilrix (for varicella (chicken pox) in healthy adults and adolescents
