= Ellipta =

Ellipta is part of GlaxoSmithKline's trade names of several inhalable asthma and chronic obstructive airway disease (COPD) combination medications that make use of the same type of inhaler:

- Fluticasone furoate (Arnuity Ellipta, Relvar Ellipta)
- Fluticasone furoate/vilanterol (Breo Ellipta, Relvar Ellipta)
- Fluticasone furoate/umeclidinium bromide/vilanterol (Trelegy Ellipta)
- Umeclidinium bromide (Incruse Ellipta)
- Umeclidinium bromide/vilanterol (Anoro Ellipta)
