= Decongestant =

Drug to relieve nasal congestion

A decongestant, or nasal decongestant, is a type of pharmaceutical drug that is used to relieve nasal congestion in the upper respiratory tract. The active ingredient in most decongestants is either pseudoephedrine or phenylephrine (the latter of which has disputed effectiveness). Intranasal corticosteroids can also be used as decongestants and antihistamines can be used to alleviate runny nose, nasal itch, and sneezing.

Topical decongestants on topical application as a dilute solution (0.05–0.1%) produce local vasoconstriction.

Regular use of decongestants for long periods should be avoided because mucosal ciliary function is impaired: atrophic rhinitis and anosmia (loss of the sense of smell) can occur due to persistent vasoconstriction.

Decongestants can be absorbed from the nose via an inhaler and produce systemic effects, mainly central nervous system stimulation and a rise in blood pressure. These drugs should be used cautiously in hypertensives and in those receiving monoamine oxidase inhibitors (MAOIs), as they can cause hypertensive crisis.

Expectorants such as guaifenesin are a related type of drug that help to clear mucus.

== Medical uses ==
Decongestants are used to treat nasal congestion, for instance in allergies, infections like the common cold, influenza, and sinus infection, and nasal polyps. Decongestants are also used to reduce redness in the treatment of simple conjunctivitis.

A 2016 Cochrane review found insufficient evidence to support the use of intranasal corticosteroids in the relief of common cold symptoms; however, the review was based on three trials, and the quality of the evidence was regarded as very low.

== Pharmacology ==
The vast majority of decongestants act via enhancing norepinephrine (noradrenaline) and epinephrine (adrenaline) or adrenergic activity by stimulating the α1-adrenergic receptor since they mediate vasoconstriction and constricting nasal vasculature causes decongestion of the nasal mucosa. This induces vasoconstriction of the blood vessels in the nose, throat, and paranasal sinuses, which results in reduced inflammation (swelling) and mucus formation in these areas.

Decongestant nasal sprays and eye drops often contain oxymetazoline and are used for topical decongestion. Pseudoephedrine acts indirectly on the adrenergic receptor system, whereas phenylephrine and oxymetazoline are direct agonists. The effects are not limited to the nose, and these medicines may cause hypertension (high blood pressure) through vasoconstriction; it is for this reason that people with hypertension are advised to avoid them. Most decongestants, however, are not pronounced stimulants, due to a lack of response from the other adrenoreceptors. Besides hypertension, common side effects include sleeplessness, anxiety, dizziness, excitability, and nervousness.

Topical nasal or ophthalmic decongestants quickly develop tachyphylaxis (a rapid decrease in the response to a drug after repeated doses over a short period). Long-term use is not recommended since these agents lose effectiveness after a few days.

== List of agents ==
=== Norepinephrine releasing agents ===
==== Common or widely marketed ====
- Ephedrine – controlled in some jurisdictions for over-the-counter use
- Levomethamphetamine (levmetamfetamine) (Vicks VapoInhaler)
- Phenylpropanolamine
- Propylhexedrine (Benzedrex)
- Pseudoephedrine (Sudafed) – controlled in some jurisdictions for over-the-counter use
  - Pseudoephedrine/loratadine (Claritin-D) – also an antihistamine via loratadine

==== Uncommon or discontinued ====
- Amphetamine (formerly sold as Benzedrine, now a controlled substance in most jurisdictions)
- Cyclopentamine
- Mephentermine
- Methylhexanamine
- Tuaminoheptane

=== α-Adrenergic receptor agonists ===
==== Common or widely marketed ====
- Naphazoline
- Oxymetazoline
- Phenylephrine
- Synephrine
- Tetryzoline
- Tramazoline
- Xylometazoline

==== Uncommon or discontinued ====
- Corbadrine (levonordefrin)
- Epinephrine (adrenaline)
- Fenoxazoline
- Metizoline
- Norepinephrine (noradrenaline)
- Tymazoline

=== Corticosteroids ===
- Beclomethasone dipropionate (Beconase, QNASL)
- Budesonide (Rhinocort)
- Ciclesonide (Omnaris, Zetonna)
- Dexamethasone
- Flunisolide (Nasarel)
- Fluticasone
- Fluticasone furoate (Veramyst)
- Fluticasone propionate (Flonase)
  - Azelastine/fluticasone (Dymista) – also an antihistamine via azelastine
- Mometasone furoate (Nasonex)
- Prednisolone
- Tixocortol (Pivalone)
- Triamcinolone (Nasacort)
- Triamcinolone acetonide (Nasacort, Allernaze)

=== Miscellaneous ===
==== Common or widely marketed ====
- Saline (water and sodium chloride solution)

==== Uncommon or discontinued ====
- Cafaminol

== See also ==
- Nasal spray
