= Fluticasone =

Chemical compound

Clinical data
- Other names: 6α,9α-Difluoro-11β,17α-dihydroxy-16α-methyl-21-thia-21-fluoromethylpregna-1,4-dien-3,20-dione; S-(Fluoromethyl)-6α,9α-difluoro-11β,17α-dihydroxy-16α-methyl-3-oxoandrosta-1,4-diene-17β-carbothioate
- Routes of administration: Intranasal, inhalation, topical
- ATC code: D07AC17 (WHO) R01AD08 (WHO) R03BA05 (WHO) R01AD58 (WHO)

Legal status
- Legal status: CA: OTC; US: ℞-only / OTC

Pharmacokinetic data
- Bioavailability: 0.51% (Intranasal)
- Protein binding: 91.0%
- Metabolism: Intranasal; Liver (CYP3A4-mediated)
- Elimination half-life: 10 hours
- Excretion: Kidney

Identifiers
- IUPAC name: S-fluoromethyl (6S,8S,9R,10S,11S,13S,14S,16R,17R)-6,9-difluoro-11,17-dihydroxy-10,13,16-trimethyl-3-oxo-6,7,8,11,12,14,15,16-octahydrocyclopenta[a]phenanthrene-17-carbothioate
- CAS Number: 90566-53-3
- PubChem CID: 5311101
- IUPHAR/BPS: 6699
- DrugBank: DB00588
- ChemSpider: 4470631
- UNII: CUT2W21N7U
- KEGG: D07981
- ChEBI: CHEBI:5134
- ChEMBL: ChEMBL1201396
- CompTox Dashboard (EPA): DTXSID0044022

Chemical and physical data
- Formula: C_{22}H_{27}F_{3}O_{4}S
- Molar mass: 444.51 g·mol^{−1}
- 3D model (JSmol): Interactive image
- SMILES: O=C(SCF)[C@]3(O)[C@]2(C[C@H](O)[C@]4(F)[C@@]/1(\C(=C/C(=O)\C=C\1)[C@@H](F)C[C@H]4[C@@H]2C[C@H]3C)C)C
- InChI: InChI=1S/C22H27F3O4S/c1-11-6-13-14-8-16(24)15-7-12(26)4-5-19(15,2)21(14,25)17(27)9-20(13,3)22(11,29)18(28)30-10-23/h4-5,7,11,13-14,16-17,27,29H,6,8-10H2,1-3H3/t11-,13+,14+,16+,17+,19+,20+,21+,22+/m1/s1; Key:MGNNYOODZCAHBA-GQKYHHCASA-N

Fluticasone is a manufactured glucocorticoid used to treat nasal congestion. Both the esters, fluticasone propionate (sold as Flovent) and fluticasone furoate, are also used as topical anti-inflammatories and inhaled corticosteroids, and are used much more commonly in comparison.

Fluticasone is on the World Health Organization's List of Essential Medicines. In 2024, it was the 23rd most commonly prescribed medication in the United States, with more than 22 million prescriptions.

== See also ==
- Fluticasone furoate
- Fluticasone furoate/vilanterol
- Fluticasone propionate
- Fluticasone/salmeterol
