= Fluticasone furoate/umeclidinium bromide/vilanterol =

Medication for chronic obstructive pulmonary disease

Combination of
- Fluticasone furoate: Corticosteroid
- Umeclidinium bromide: Muscarinic antagonist
- Vilanterol: Ultra-long-acting β_{2} agonist

Clinical data
- Trade names: Trelegy Ellipta, Elebrato Ellipta, Temybric Ellipta
- Other names: FF/UMEC/VI
- AHFS/Drugs.com: Monograph
- MedlinePlus: a618017
- License data: US DailyMed: Trelegy Ellipta
- Pregnancy category: AU: B3
- Routes of administration: Inhalation
- ATC code: R03AL08 (WHO)

Legal status
- Legal status: CA: ℞-only; UK: POM (Prescription only); US: ℞-only; EU: Rx-only; In general: ℞ (Prescription only)

Identifiers
- CAS Number: 2447636-37-3
- KEGG: D11035

Fluticasone furoate/umeclidinium bromide/vilanterol, sold under the brand name Trelegy Ellipta among others, is a fixed-dose combination inhaled medication that is used for the maintenance treatment of chronic obstructive pulmonary disease (COPD). The medications work in different ways: fluticasone furoate is an inhaled corticosteroid (ICS), umeclidinium is a long-acting muscarinic antagonist (LAMA), and vilanterol is a long-acting beta-agonist (LABA).

In 2023, it was the 118th most commonly prescribed medication in the United States, with more than 5 million prescriptions.

== Medical uses ==
The combination fluticasone furoate/umeclidinium bromide/vilanterol product is approved by the US Food and Drug Administration with an indication for the maintenance treatment of a chronic lung problem called chronic obstructive pulmonary disease (COPD) in adults who (1) have already tried fluticasone furoate/vilanterol (brand name Breo Ellipta) but are still experiencing symptoms of airway obstruction or who want to reduce the risk for COPD exacerbations and (2) are already receiving umeclidinium and fluticasone furoate/vilanterol and would like to consolidate their inhaler therapy into a single product. Similarly, in the European Union, FF/UMEC/VI is indicated for the maintenance treatment in adults with moderate to severe COPD who are not adequately treated by an inhaled corticosteroid (ICS) plus long-acting beta-agonist (LABA) combination or a LABA plus long-acting muscarinic antagonist (LAMA) combination. Because FF/UMEC/VI is for maintenance (chronic prophylaxis) treatment, it is not used when people are experiencing acute symptoms consistent with worsening airway obstruction (i.e. COPD exacerbation or an asthma exacerbation).

The 2018 National Institute for Health and Care Excellence (NICE) guidelines recommend consideration for ICS/LABA/LAMA triple therapy (like FF/UMEC/VI) provided that the person with COPD has received optimal non-pharmacologic management (e.g. smoking cessation), is experiencing acute COPD exacerbations (either 1 severe exacerbation leading to hospitalization or 2 moderate exacerbations within 1 year), and their COPD has worsened their quality of life. The 2020 Global Initiative for Chronic Obstructive Lung Disease (GOLD) guidelines recommend consideration for triple therapy for people with COPD that—despite ICS/LABA therapy—are persistently breathless, cannot exercise due to their symptoms, or develop further exacerbations.

=== Available forms ===
Fluticasone furoate/umeclidinium bromide/vilanterol is only available as an inhaler, which generally contains thirty doses (one-month supply) of medicated powder for inhalation (except in the case of, e.g., sample products from the manufacturer or those produced specifically for hospitals [institutional formulations], which contain 14 doses). FF/UMEC/VI exists as a dry-powder inhaler, which means that the force of the user's breath causes the medicated powder to leave the device and enter the lungs (unlike, e.g., a metered-dose inhaler which includes a propellant).

== Contraindications ==
Fluticasone furoate/umeclidinium bromide/vilanterol is contraindicated in people who are allergic to any of the individual medication components (i.e. an allergy to vilanterol precludes use of the combination product) or who are severely allergic to milk proteins. This is because each dose of FF/UMEC/VI is formulated with lactose monohydrate (a sugar found in milk), a portion of which contains detectable milk proteins.

== Adverse effects ==
The adverse effects of fluticasone furoate/umeclidinium bromide/vilanterol include those that are characteristic of its individual components. For example, there is a risk for anticholinergic side effects (e.g. difficulty urinating) due to umeclidinium. Effects on the cardiovascular system, such as increased pulse, elevated blood pressure, and abnormal heart rhythms, can occur due to vilanterol. Fluticasone furoate, as an inhaled corticosteroid (ICS), can cause side effects that are characteristic of corticosteroids, such as decreased bone mineral density, adrenal suppression (decreased production of corticosteroids in the body), and a weakened immune system. There is an elevated risk of pneumonia (a type of serious lung infection) with FF/UMEC/VI; in clinical trials, there was a 1.53-fold higher risk of pneumonia in people that received FF/UMEC/VI or FF/VI instead of UMEC/VI (which does not include fluticasone furoate, an ICS).

== Interactions ==
Fluticasone furoate/umeclidinium bromide/vilanterol may have drug–drug interactions (DDIs) that are both pharmacokinetic (related to metabolism) and pharmacodynamic (related to the effect of medications) in nature. FF/UMEC/VI is susceptible to DDIs that would normally arise from any of the individual components of the medication.

=== Pharmacokinetic interactions ===
All three components are substrates of the efflux transporter p-glycoprotein (p-gp), a protein that causes drugs to be transported out of cells. The presence of p-gp inhibiting drugs did not appear to effect the pharmacokinetics of vilanterol, though the area under the curve (a measure of systemic absorption) of umeclidinium increased 1.4-fold. The effect of p-gp inhibitors on fluticasone pharmacokinetics are unknown.

==== Fluticasone furoate ====
Fluticasone furoate is metabolized by cytochrome P450 3A4 (CYP3A4). Medications that are inhibitors of CYP3A4 (e.g. ketoconazole) may decrease fluticasone's metabolism in the body, causing levels to accumulate. The bioavailability (the amount of a medication that reaches the blood after administration) of fluticasone in the FF/UMEC/VI product is low (15.2%), decreasing the risk of acute toxicity in overdose/accumulation situations. However, if a person is exposed to high doses of fluticasone over time, it may increase their risk of experiencing Cushing's syndrome (a syndrome that occurs due to high levels of glucocorticoids, like fluticasone, and includes muscular weakness, weight gain, and excessive hairiness). In drug interaction studies of FF/UMEC/VI in the presence of the CYP3A4 inhibitor ketoconazole, adrenal insufficiency (as measured by serum cortisol levels was noted at 24 hours (27% decrease in cortisol).

==== Umeclidinium bromide ====
Umeclidinium is primarily metabolized by CYP2D6, in addition to a few secondary metabolism pathways (e.g. glucuronidation). At doses of umeclidinium that are above the recommended doses, no clinically significant differences in blood levels of umeclidinium was found after repeated dosing in people with impaired CYP2D6 function (compared to people with normal CYP2D6 function).

==== Vilanterol ====
Vilanterol is also a CYP3A4 substrate. Like fluticasone, CYP3A4 inhibitors may increase the levels of vilanterol in the body. In drug interaction studies of FF/UMEC/VI in the presence of the CYP3A4 inhibitor ketoconazole, side effects that are characteristic of vilanterol overdose were not observed (i.e. elevated heart rate).

=== Pharmacodynamic interactions ===
==== Fluticasone furoate ====
Fluticasone furoate is a corticosteroid, a type of hormone that can suppress the function of the immune system (which fights off infections). This can increase the risk of infection, especially oral fungal infections when people do not rinse out their mouths with water after using fluticasone. Combining fluticasone with other steroids (e.g. oral prednisone) may theoretically increase the risk of infections.

==== Umeclidinium bromide ====
Umeclidinium is a medication with anticholinergic properties. When combined with other medication that also antagonize cholinergic receptors, this may lead to a duplicate anticholinergic effect, increasing the risk for anticholinergic spectrum side effects (e.g. dry mouth, constipation).

==== Vilanterol ====
Vilanterol is a beta_{2}-adrenergic receptor agonist. When combined with medications that have the opposite effect (i.e. beta blockers, like carvedilol), this may theoretically prevent vilanterol from working as intended.

== Pharmacology ==
Fluticasone furoate/umeclidinium bromide/vilanterol is a combination product made up of three medications:

- fluticasone, an inhaled corticosteroid (ICS)
- umeclidinium, a long-acting muscarinic antagonist (LAMA) (i.e. an anticholinergic medication)
- vilanterol, a long-acting beta-agonist (LABA) (specifically, a beta_{2}-adrenergic receptor agonist)

In the setting of chronic obstructive pulmonary disease (COPD), an inhaled corticosteroid (ICS) will reduce inflammation while a long-acting muscarinic antagonist (LAMA) and a long-acting beta-agonist (LABA) will cause bronchodilation (widening and opening of the bronchi, the airways of the lungs). Because LABAs and LAMAs are "long-acting", they are not used for acute problems with breathing.

== Chemistry ==
=== Fluticasone furoate ===
	Fluticasone furoate	Fluticasone propionate	Fluticasone
Chemical structure			

Fluticasone furoate, like fluticasone propionate, is a synthetic corticosteroid that is derived from fluticasone (another synthetic corticosteroid).

=== Umeclidinium bromide ===
	Umeclidinium bromide
Chemical structure	

Umeclidinium bromide is the bromide (Br^{−}) salt form of umeclidinium, which contains a quaternary ammonium compound.

=== Vilanterol ===
	Vilanterol
Chemical structure	

Vilanterol is a 1,3-dichlorobenzene derivative.

== History ==
Fluticasone furoate/umeclidinium bromide/vilanterol was approved for medical use in the United States and in the European Union in 2017. It was approved in the European Union with an additional indication in June 2019.

Due to the COVID-19 pandemic, a meeting of the Pulmonary-Allergy Drugs Advisory Committee (PADAC) of the U.S. Food and Drug Administration (FDA) scheduled for April 2020, on the subject of FF/UMEC/VI was postponed indefinitely. The Advisory Committee had planned to discuss the manufacturer's claim that the medication reduces all-cause mortality in people with COPD. FF/UMEC/VI was one of many medications whose regulatory status was affected by the pandemic.
