= Vilanterol =

Asthma drug – beta-adrenergic agonist

Clinical data
- License data: EU EMA: by INN
- Pregnancy category: AU: B3
- ATC code: R03AK10 (WHO) (+fluticasone) R03AL03 (WHO) (+umeclidinium)

Legal status
- Legal status: AU: S4 (Prescription only); UK: POM (Prescription only); US: ℞-only; In general: ℞ (Prescription only)

Identifiers
- IUPAC name: 4-{(1R)-2-[(6-{2-[(2,6-Dichlorobenzyl)oxy]ethoxy}hexyl)amino]-1-hydroxyethyl}-2-(hydroxymethyl)phenol
- CAS Number: 503068-34-6
- PubChem CID: 10184665
- IUPHAR/BPS: 7353
- ChemSpider: 8360167
- UNII: 028LZY775B
- KEGG: D09696
- ChEBI: CHEBI:75037
- ChEMBL: ChEMBL1198857
- CompTox Dashboard (EPA): DTXSID80198318
- ECHA InfoCard: 100.217.751

Chemical and physical data
- Formula: C_{24}H_{33}Cl_{2}NO_{5}
- Molar mass: 486.43 g·mol^{−1}
- 3D model (JSmol): Interactive image
- SMILES: c1cc(c(c(c1)Cl)COCCOCCCCCCNC[C@@H](c2ccc(c(c2)CO)O)O)Cl
- InChI: InChI=1S/C24H33Cl2NO5/c25-21-6-5-7-22(26)20(21)17-32-13-12-31-11-4-2-1-3-10-27-15-24(30)18-8-9-23(29)19(14-18)16-28/h5-9,14,24,27-30H,1-4,10-13,15-17H2/t24-/m0/s1; Key:DAFYYTQWSAWIGS-DEOSSOPVSA-N

Vilanterol is an ultra-long-acting β_{2}-adrenoceptor agonist which was approved in May 2013 in combination with fluticasone furoate for sale as Breo Ellipta by GlaxoSmithKline for the treatment of chronic obstructive pulmonary disease (COPD). The combination is also approved for the treatment of asthma in Canada, Europe, Japan and New Zealand.

Vilanterol is available in following combinations:

- with inhaled corticosteroid fluticasone furoate—fluticasone furoate/vilanterol (trade names Breo Ellipta (U.S., NZ), Relvar Ellipta (EU, RU, JPN))
- with muscarinic antagonist umeclidinium bromide—umeclidinium bromide/vilanterol (trade name Anoro Ellipta)
- with inhaled corticosteroid fluticasone furoate and muscarinic antagonist umeclidinium bromide—fluticasone furoate/umeclidinium bromide/vilanterol (trade name Trelegy Ellipta)

== See also ==
- Salmeterol—the long-acting β_{2}-adrenergic receptor agonist from which vilanterol was derived.
