= C14H20N2O =

The molecular formula C_{14}H_{20}N_{2}O may refer to:

- 5-Ethoxy-DMT
- 4-HO-DET, a psychedelic drug
- 4-HO-MiPT
- 4-HO-MPT
- 5-HO-DET
- 5-MeO-MET
- 5-MeO-NiPT
- 6-Hydroxy-DET
- 6-Methyl-5-MeO-DMT
- Pyrrocaine
- Tetramethylserotonin
  - α,N,N,O-TeMS
  - 5-Methoxy-2,N,N-trimethyltryptamine
  - 5-Methoxy-7,N,N-trimethyltryptamine
- Tymazoline
- Zalsupindole
