= Inhaler =

Medical device used to deliver medicines into lungs

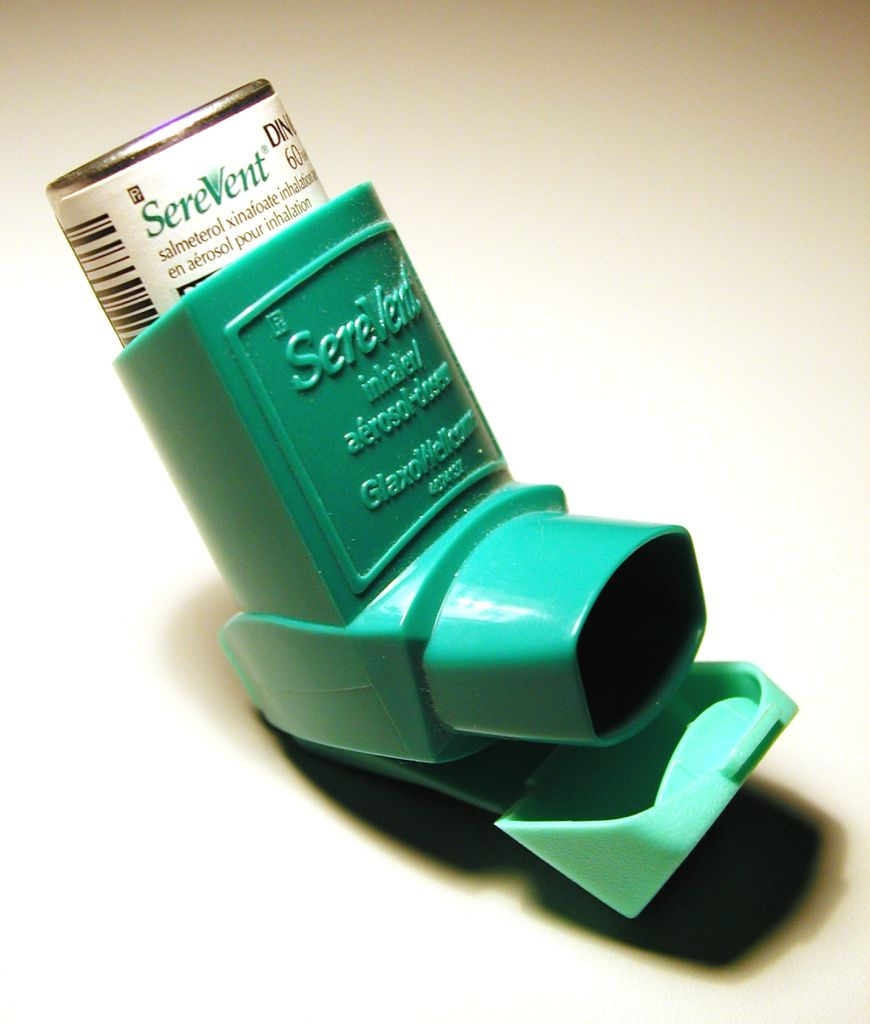
- Metered-dose inhaler (MDI)
- Specialty: Pulmonology

An inhaler (puffer, asthma pump or allergy spray) is a medical device used for delivering medicines into the lungs through the work of a person's breathing. This allows medicines to be delivered to and absorbed in the lungs, which provides the ability for targeted medical treatment to this specific region of the body, as well as a reduction in the side effects of oral medications. There are a wide variety of inhalers, and they are commonly used to treat numerous medical conditions with asthma and chronic obstructive pulmonary disease (COPD) being among the most notable.

Some of the common types of inhalers include metered-dose inhalers, dry powder inhalers, soft mist inhalers, and nebulizers. Each device has advantages and disadvantages and can be selected based on individually specific patient needs, as well as age, pathological conditions, coordination, and lung function. Proper education on inhaler use is important to ensure that inhaled medication creates its proper effects in the lungs. Using a spacer can ensure that more medicine reaches the lungs, thus providing the most optimal treatment.

== Medical uses ==
Inhalers are designed to deliver medication directly to the lungs through a person's own breathing. This may benefit a patient by providing medicines directly to areas of disease, allowing medication to take a greater effect on its intended target, and limit side effects of medications when administered locally. Inhalers are used in a variety of different medical conditions with diseases of the lungs and respiratory system being among the most common. Individuals with these diseases/conditions need medications designed to decrease airway inflammation and obstruction to allow for easier and comfortable breathing. Antibiotic medications have even been developed for inhalers to allow for direct delivery to areas of infection within the lungs. Two of the most common conditions that warrant inhaler therapy are asthma and chronic obstructive pulmonary disease.

=== Asthma ===
Asthma is a condition of intermittent airway obstruction due to inflammatory processes in the lungs. Inhaled medications are used to calm down the inflammation present in the lungs and allow for relief of the airway obstruction. Common inhaled medications used for treatment of asthma include long term inhalational steroidal anti-inflammatory drugs (most commonly inhaled corticosteroids, also called ICS) and fast-relieving bronchodilators such as salbutamol (known commonly as "Ventolin") and salmeterol. These medications allow for patients to have relief of airway obstruction symptoms and reduced inflammation. If some people are unable to use inhalers, non-steroidal anti-inflammatory drugs (NSAIDs) may be used, but with caution since they may cause immunological hypersensitivity to NSAIDs, resulting in respiratory-related symptoms such as bronchospasms, acute asthma exacerbation, and severe asthma morbidity.

=== Chronic obstructive pulmonary disease (COPD) ===
COPD is an obstructive lung disease due to long-term damage to the airways of the lungs. The long-term damage leads to the inability of the airways to open properly, causing airway obstruction. Inhaled medications allow patients to see improvement in symptoms and better function of daily living. Some commonly used inhaled medications in patient's with COPD are ipratroprium, salmeterol, and corticosteroids. Inhalers that combine two or three different medications including inhaled corticosteroids, long-active muscarinic medications (LAMA) and long acting beta2 agonists (LABA) for treating COPD may be associated with improvements in some quality of life variables and small improvements in lung function and respiratory symptoms, however, may also be associated with an increase in the risk of pneumonia.

=== Analgesia ===
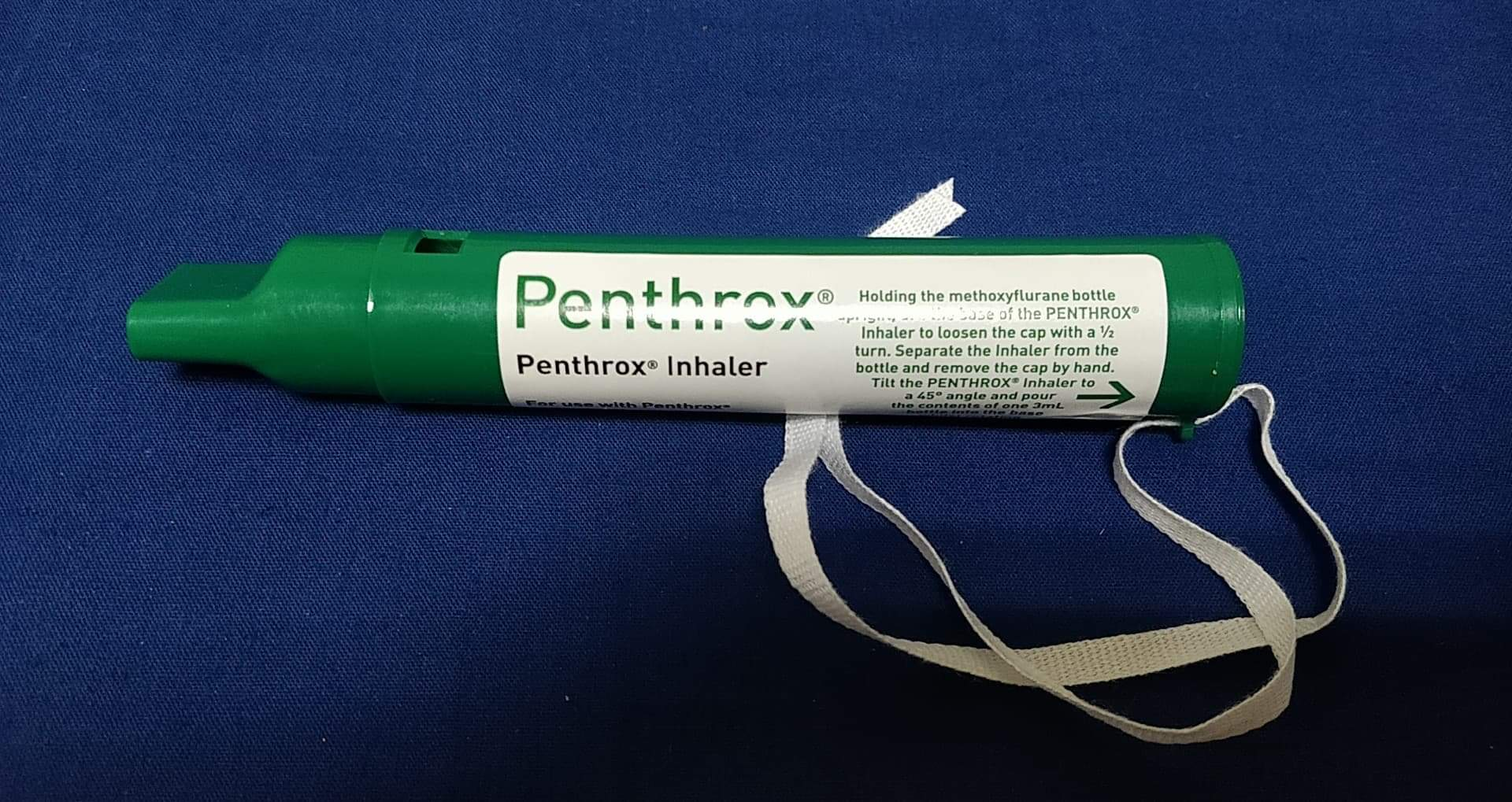
Methoxyflurane handheld inhaler

Methoxyflurane is a volatile anesthetic agent that can be self-administered in children and adults, using a hand-held inhaler device, for the relief of moderate or severe pain. The device may also be used for short episodes of pain as a result of procedures. A single-use inhaler device, along with a single 3 milliliter brown glass vial of methoxyflurane allows people who are conscious and hemodynamically stable (including children over the age of 5 years) to self-administer the medication, under supervision. Pain relief begins after 6–8 breaths and continues for several minutes after stopping inhalation.

== Types of inhalers ==
=== Meter-dosed inhaler (MDI) ===
The most common type of inhaler is the pressurized metered-dose inhaler (MDI) which is made up of 3 standard components- a metal canister, plastic actuator, and a metering valve. The medication is typically stored in solution in a pressurized canister that contains a propellant or suspension. The MDI canister is attached to a plastic, hand-operated actuator. On activation, the metered-dose inhaler releases a fixed dose of medication in aerosol form through the actuator and into a patient's lungs. These devices require significant coordination as a person must discharge the medication at or near the same time that they inhale in order for the medication to be effective. This problem is mitigated by the use of a spacer chamber, which allows the fine particle suspension to slow down and be more effectively inhaled into the lower airways. It is preferable that a spacer chamber is used for delivering medication by MDI for all age groups.

=== Dry powder inhaler (DPI) ===
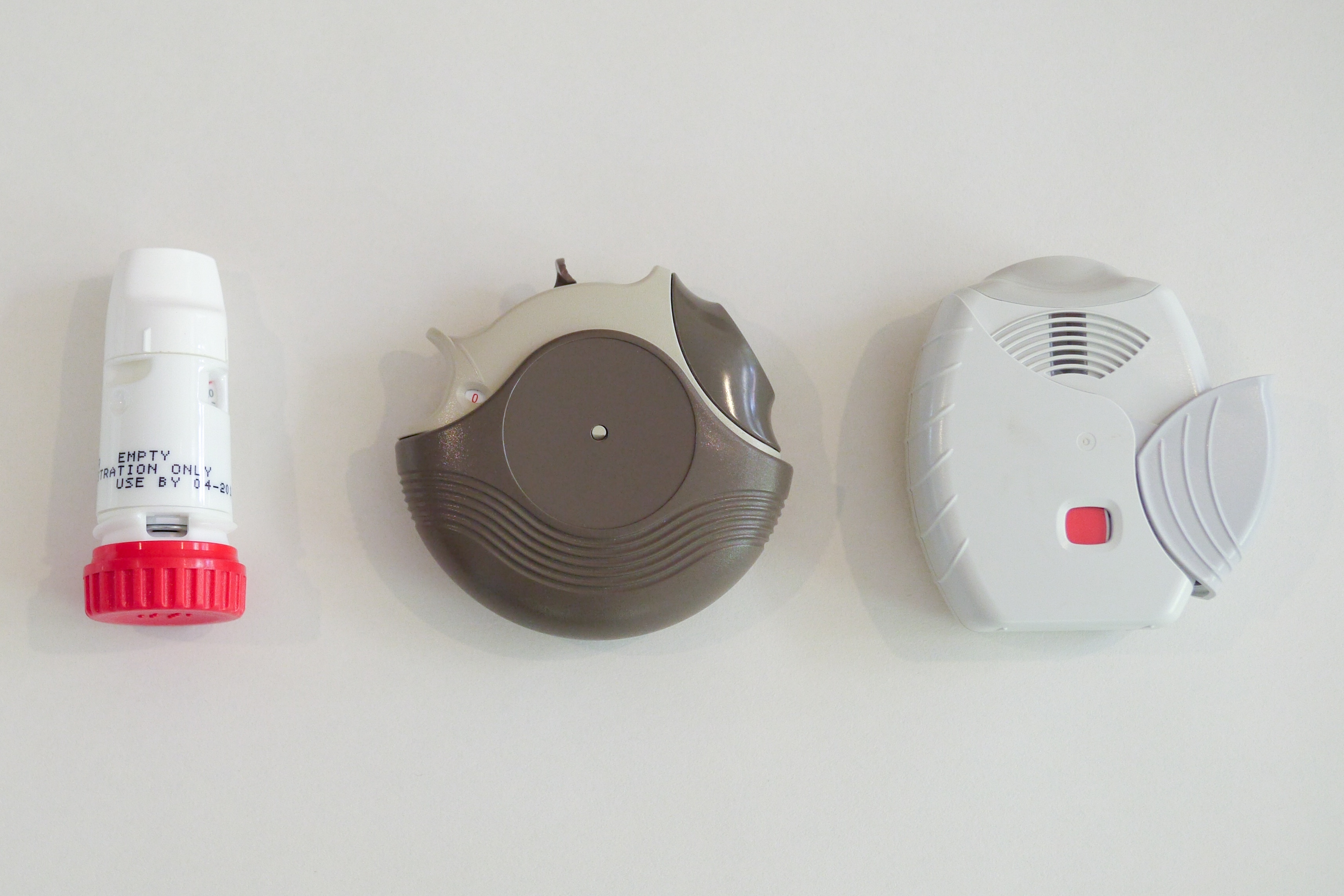
Different types of dry powder inhalers

Dry powder inhalers release a metered or device-measured dose of powdered medication that is inhaled through a DPI device. This device usually contains a chamber in which the powdered medication is deposited prior to each dosage. The powder can then be inhaled with a quick breath. This allows for medication to be delivered to the lungs without the need for use of propellant/suspension.

=== Soft mist inhaler (SMI) ===
Soft mist inhalers release a light mist containing medication without the need for a propellant/suspension. Upon pressing a button, the inhaler creates a mist of medication, allowing for inhalation into the lungs. SMIs suspend inhaled medications for roughly 1.2 seconds, which is longer than the average MDI inhaler suspension time period. This requires less coordination when using and may be helpful for young patients or patients that find the MDI inhalers difficult to use.

=== Nebulizer ===
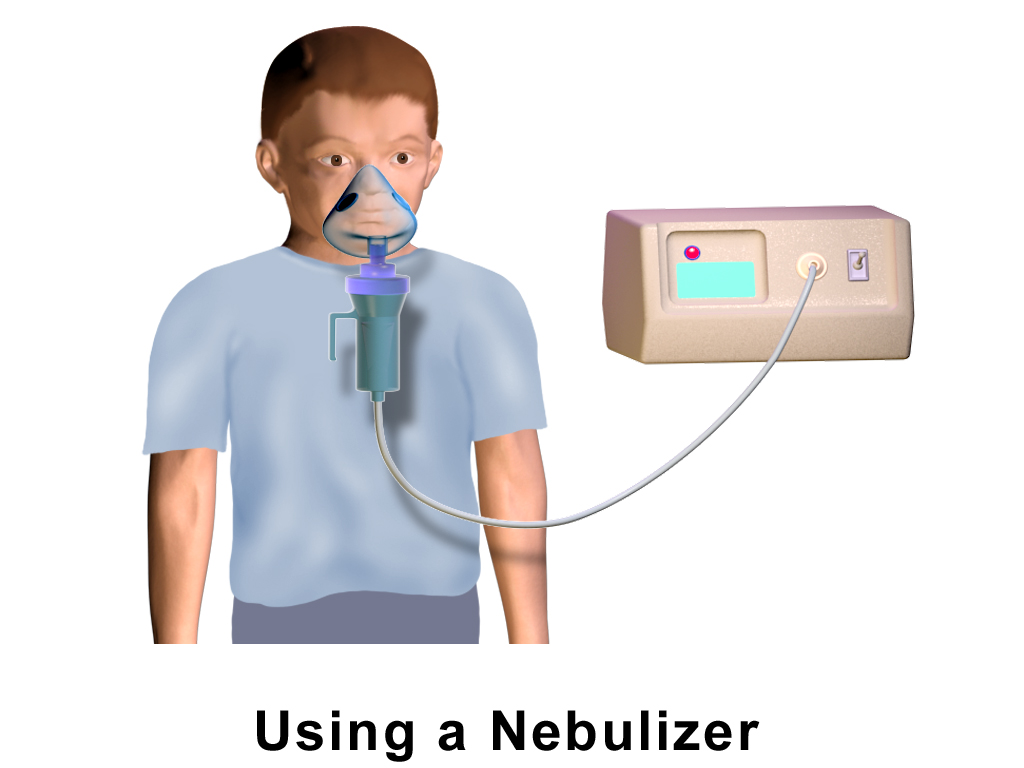
Nebulizer with face mask

Nebulizers are designed to deliver medications over an extended period of time over multiple breaths through a mouthpiece or face mask. They generate a continuous mist with aerosolized medication, allowing a patient to breathe normally and receive medications. They are commonly used in infants and toddlers requiring inhaled medications or in patients in the hospital who require inhaled medications.

=== Smart inhaler ===
The smart-inhaler is an inhaler that will automatically update an app with information that includes the time of day, air quality, and how many times it has been used through sensor technology on the device. The first smart-inhaler was approved in 2019 by the FDA, its purpose is to track patient use of the device and some other circumstantial factors that could affect the effectiveness of the dosage. This information is sent via Bluetooth to a mobile device app, and is later shared with their physician to determine what kind of things can trigger issues with asthma and other problems. This technology presents a great way to cut down on medical costs associated with asthma and also help patients better manage their condition with fewer emergencies.

The Teva ProAir Digihaler was the first FDA approved smart inhaler. It shows how effective the device is at aiding patients in using the proper dose amount for their asthma. In a study published by the European Respiratory Journal, the ProAir Digihaler accurately identified when patients were using their inhalers and whether they were effectively administering the dose in a 370 patient trial with the device. This study further gives an overview on the technology regarding applications and devices that help aid in the tracking and medication management for asthma and other lung conditions. Another study showed that smart inhalers accurately recorded all doses administered by patients with their technology, which signifies their importance in providing accurate dosage information to patients and their physicians.

== Propellants ==
In 2009, the FDA banned the use of inhalers that use chlorofluorocarbons (CFC) as propellants. In their place, inhalers now use hydrofluorocarbons (HFCs), which are also called hydrofluoroalkanes (HFAs). HFCs are greenhouse gases, but do not deplete the ozone layer. While some people with asthma and advocacy groups contend that HFC inhalers are not as effective, published clinical studies indicate CFC and HFC inhalers are equally effective in controlling asthma.

While the impact of CFCs from inhalers on the ozone layer had been minuscule (dwarfed by industrial processes using CFCs), the FDA in its interpretation of the Montreal Protocol mandated the switch in propellants. Patients expressed concern about the high price of the HFA inhalers as there were initially no generic versions, whereas generic CFC inhalers had been available.

== Proper use ==
Using an inhaler

Proper use of inhalers often involves initial deep breathing (which involves mostly the diaphragm's movements), and then rapid breathing (which involves most of the muscles of respiration, such as external and internal intercostal muscles) during intake of one or more puffs from the inhalers. Improper use of inhalers can lead to distribution of the medicine into the mouth or throat where it cannot create its desired effect and may cause harm.

== Price and availability ==
In the United States, pharmaceutical manufacturers use legal and regulatory strategies to keep inhaler prices artificially high. There has been little innovation in inhaler technology for decades — the most recent drug to be approved by the FDA for treating asthma or COPD via a novel target of action was Ipratropium bromide in 1986. Since then, manufacturers have used small changes to drug delivery mechanisms, or have switched active ingredients from one inhaler device to another (a strategy known as a "device hop") to keep patents active. This has the effect of limiting competition, keeping inhalers expensive. Because of high prices, patients sometimes skip doses or give up using their inhalers.

== History ==
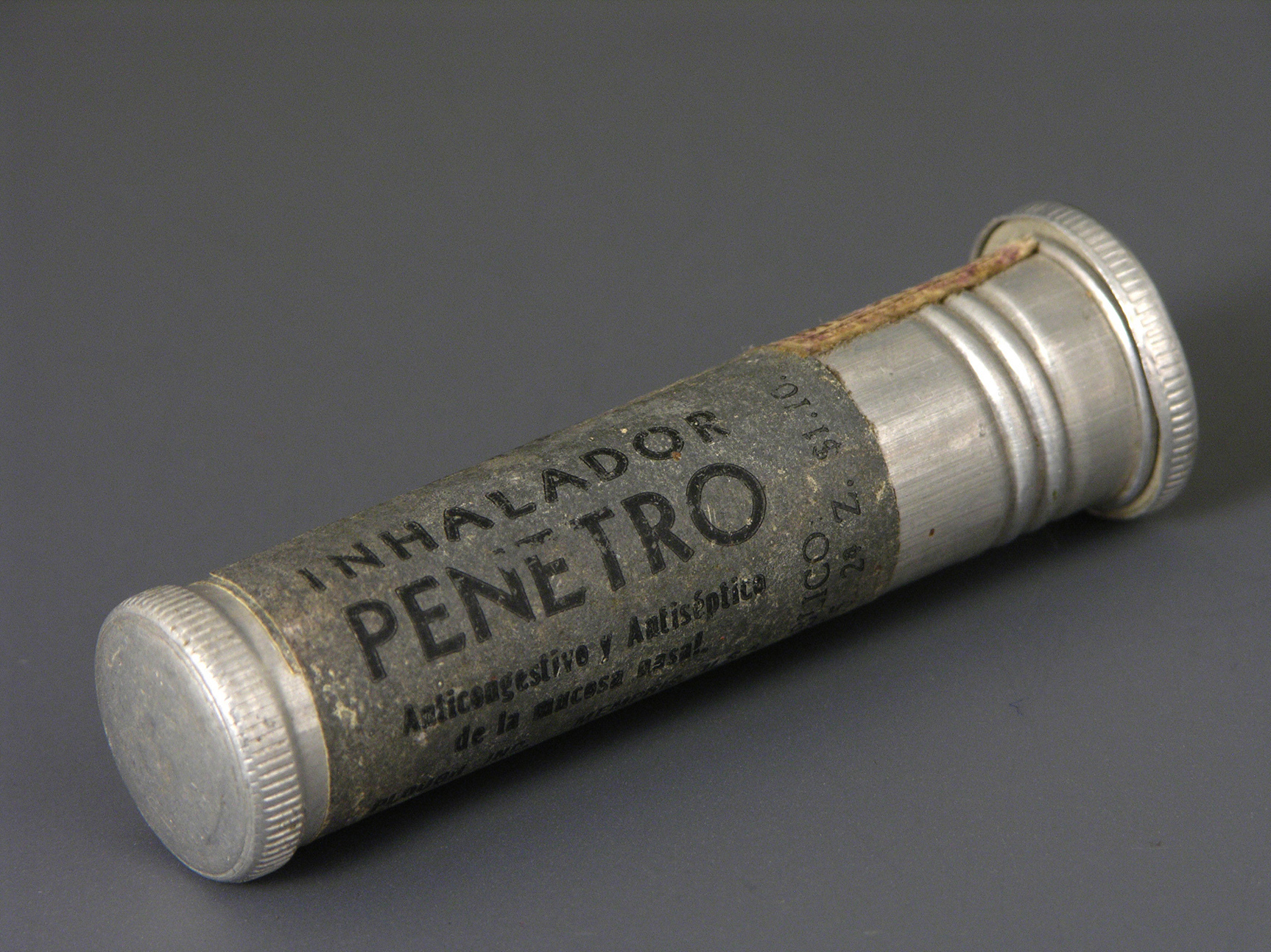
Penetro brand inhaler from mid 20th century Mexico, part of the permanent collection of the Museo del Objeto del Objeto

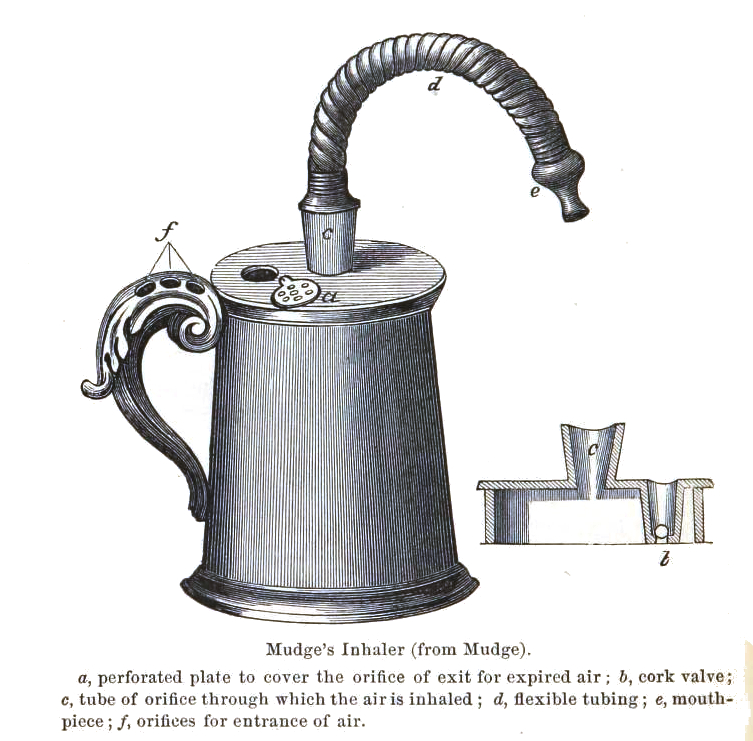
Inhaler designed by John Mudge in 1778

The idea of directly delivering medication into the lungs was based on ancient traditional cures that involved the use of aromatic and medicinal vapors. These did not involve any special devices beyond the apparatus used for burning or heating to produce fumes. Early inhalation devices included one devised by John Mudge in 1778. It had a pewter mug with a hole allowing attachment of a flexible tube. Mudge used it for the treatment of coughs using opium. These devices evolved with modifications by Wolfe, Mackenzie (1872) and better mouth attachments such as by Beigel in 1866. Many of these early inhalers needed heat to vaporize the active chemical ingredient. The benefits of forced expiration and inspiration to treat asthma were noted by J. S. Monell in 1865. Chemicals used in inhalers included ammonia, chlorine, iodine, tar, balsams, turpentine camphor and numerous others in combinations. Julius Mount Bleyer used a variation in 1890 in New York.

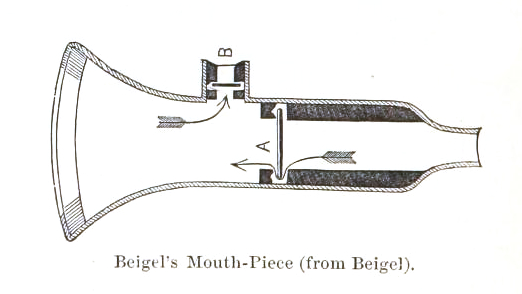
Mouthpiece for an inhaler designed by Dr Beigel (1867)

In 1968, Robert Wexler of Abbott Laboratories developed the Analgizer, a disposable inhaler that allowed the self-administration of methoxyflurane vapor in air for analgesia. The Analgizer consisted of a polyethylene cylinder 5 inches long and 1 inch in diameter with a 1 inch long mouthpiece. The device contained a rolled wick of polypropylene felt which held 15 milliliters of methoxyflurane.

Because of the simplicity of the Analgizer and the pharmacological characteristics of methoxyflurane, it was easy for patients to self-administer the drug and rapidly achieve a level of conscious analgesia which could be maintained and adjusted as necessary over a period of time lasting from a few minutes to several hours. The 15 milliliter supply of methoxyflurane would typically last for two to three hours, during which time the user would often be partly amnesic to the sense of pain; the device could be refilled if necessary.

The Analgizer was found to be safe, effective, and simple to administer in obstetric patients during childbirth, as well as for patients with bone fractures and joint dislocations, and for dressing changes on burn patients. When used for labor analgesia, the Analgizer allows labor to progress normally and with no apparent adverse effect on Apgar scores. All vital signs remain normal in obstetric patients, newborns, and injured patients. The Analgizer was widely utilized for analgesia and sedation until the early 1970s, in a manner that foreshadowed the patient-controlled analgesia infusion pumps of today. The Analgizer inhaler was withdrawn in 1974, but use of methoxyflurane as a sedative and analgesic continues in Australia and New Zealand in the form of the Penthrox inhaler.

== See also ==
- List of medical inhalants
- Decongestant
