= Ritiometan =

Chemical compound

Clinical data
- Trade names: Nécyrane
- Other names: (Methylidynetrithio)triacetic acid
- AHFS/Drugs.com: International Drug Names
- Routes of administration: Topical (intranasal)
- ATC code: R01AX05 (WHO)

Identifiers
- IUPAC name: 2,2',2''-(methanetriyltrisulfanediyl)triacetic acid
- CAS Number: 34914-39-1
- PubChem CID: 65787
- ChemSpider: 59206
- UNII: J89LM8QVEE
- CompTox Dashboard (EPA): DTXSID50188468
- ECHA InfoCard: 100.047.516

Chemical and physical data
- Formula: C_{7}H_{10}O_{6}S_{3}
- Molar mass: 286.33 g·mol^{−1}
- 3D model (JSmol): Interactive image
- SMILES: O=C(O)CSC(SCC(=O)O)SCC(=O)O
- InChI: InChI=1S/C7H10O6S3/c8-4(9)1-14-7(15-2-5(10)11)16-3-6(12)13/h7H,1-3H2,(H,8,9)(H,10,11)(H,12,13); Key:ZBNBQISDCFIEQC-UHFFFAOYSA-N

Ritiometan is an antibacterial used in nasal sprays. Also, it is used in an aerosol preparation for the treatment of infections of the nose and throat. It is marketed in France under the trade name Nécyrane.
