= Calcium hexamine thiocyanate =

Combination drug

Clinical data
- ATC code: R01AX01 (WHO)

Identifiers
- CAS Number: 859974-17-7
- PubChem CID: 122197551
- ChemSpider: 58955964
- UNII: RPJ55R4EFX
- ChEMBL: ChEMBL3707448
- CompTox Dashboard (EPA): DTXSID60586815

Chemical and physical data
- 3D model (JSmol): Interactive image
- SMILES: C1N2CN3CN1CN(C2)C3.C(#N)[S-].C(#N)[S-].[Ca+2]
- InChI: InChI=1S/C6H12N4.2CHNS.Ca/c1-7-2-9-4-8(1)5-10(3-7)6-9;2*2-1-3;/h1-6H2;2*3H;/q;;;+2/p-2; Key:MYCYALXPHWPBMJ-UHFFFAOYSA-L

Calcium hexamine thiocyanate is a pharmaceutical drug that has been used in nasal preparations. It contains hexamine (hexamethylenetetramine) and thiocyanate. This combination has also been used for the treatment of urinary tract infections.
