= ATC code R01 =

ATC code R01 Nasal preparations is a therapeutic subgroup of the Anatomical Therapeutic Chemical Classification System, a system of alphanumeric codes developed by the World Health Organization (WHO) for the classification of drugs and other medical products. Subgroup R01 is part of the anatomical group R Respiratory system.

Codes for veterinary use (ATCvet codes) can be created by placing the letter Q in front of the human ATC code: for example, QR01.
National versions of the ATC classification may include additional codes not present in this list, which follows the WHO version.

== R01A Decongestants and other nasal preparations for topical use ==
=== R01AA Sympathomimetics, plain ===
R01AA02 Cyclopentamine
R01AA03 Ephedrine
R01AA04 Phenylephrine
R01AA05 Oxymetazoline
R01AA06 Tetryzoline
R01AA07 Xylometazoline
R01AA08 Naphazoline
R01AA09 Tramazoline
R01AA10 Metizoline
R01AA11 Tuaminoheptane
R01AA12 Fenoxazoline
R01AA13 Tymazoline
R01AA14 Epinephrine
R01AA15 Indanazoline

=== R01AB Sympathomimetics, combinations excluding corticosteroids ===
R01AB01 Phenylephrine
R01AB02 Naphazoline
R01AB03 Tetryzoline
R01AB05 Ephedrine
R01AB06 Xylometazoline
R01AB07 Oxymetazoline
R01AB08 Tuaminoheptane

=== R01AC Antiallergic agents, excluding corticosteroids ===
R01AC01 Cromoglicic acid
R01AC02 Levocabastine
R01AC03 Azelastine
R01AC04 Antazoline
R01AC05 Spaglumic acid
R01AC06 Thonzylamine
R01AC07 Nedocromil
R01AC08 Olopatadine
R01AC51 Cromoglicic acid, combinations

=== R01AD Corticosteroids ===
R01AD01 Beclometasone
R01AD02 Prednisolone
R01AD03 Dexamethasone
R01AD04 Flunisolide
R01AD05 Budesonide
R01AD06 Betamethasone
R01AD07 Tixocortol
R01AD08 Fluticasone
R01AD09 Mometasone
R01AD11 Triamcinolone
R01AD12 Fluticasone furoate
R01AD13 Ciclesonide
R01AD52 Prednisolone, combinations
R01AD53 Dexamethasone, combinations
R01AD57 Tixocortol, combinations
R01AD58 Fluticasone, combinations
R01AD59 Mometasone, combinations
R01AD60 Hydrocortisone, combinations

=== R01AX Other nasal preparations ===
R01AX01 Calcium hexamine thiocyanate
R01AX02 Retinol
R01AX03 Ipratropium bromide
R01AX05 Ritiometan
R01AX06 Mupirocin
R01AX07 Hexamidine
R01AX08 Framycetin
R01AX09 Hyaluronic acid
R01AX10 Various
R01AX30 Combinations

== R01B Nasal decongestants for systemic use ==
=== R01BA Sympathomimetics ===
R01BA01 Phenylpropanolamine
R01BA02 Pseudoephedrine
R01BA03 Phenylephrine
R01BA51 Phenylpropanolamine, combinations
R01BA52 Pseudoephedrine, combinations
R01BA53 Phenylephrine, combinations
