= Julius Mount Bleyer =

American physician (1859–1915)

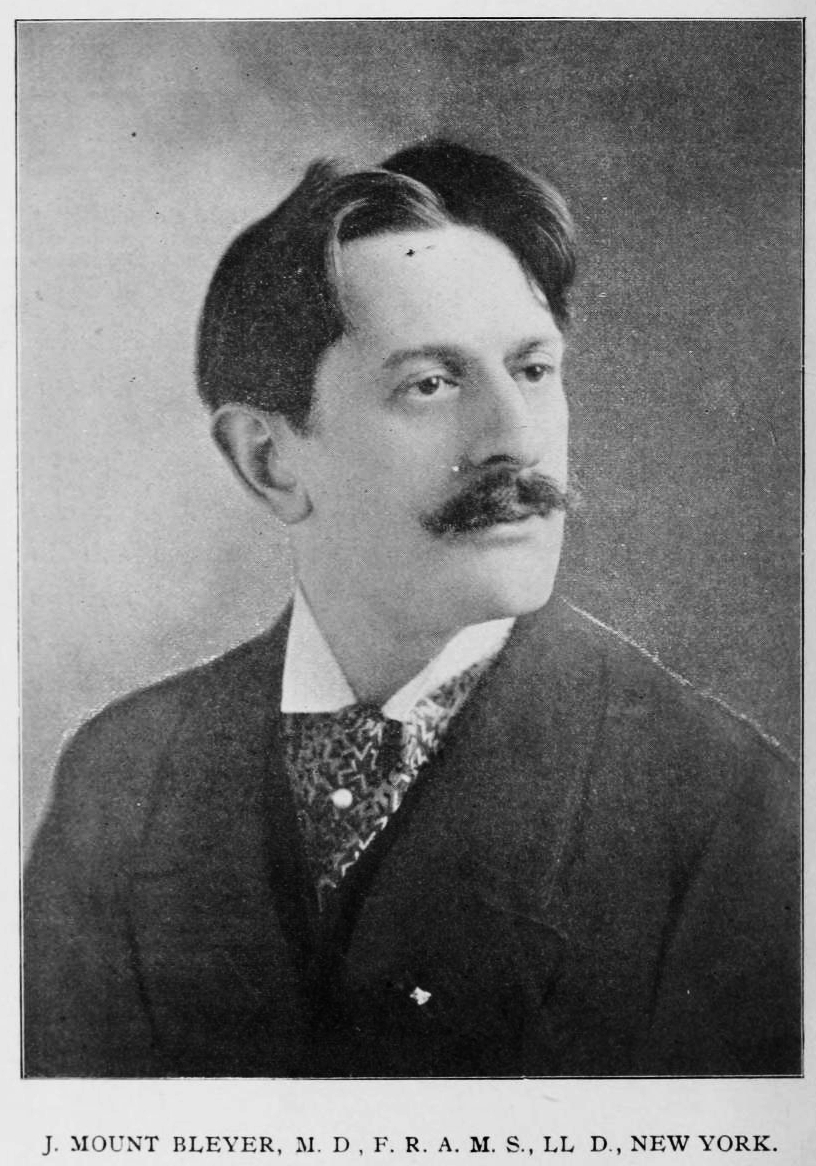

Julius Mount Bleyer (16 March 1859 – 3 April 1915) was a New York doctor who specialized in laryngology who took a keen interest in medical jurisprudence. He studied the methods used for capital punishment and as a member of a commission, was among the first to propose lethal injections in 1888. He pointed out in The Medico-Legal Journal, the problems with other methods of executing death sentences including decapitation and electrocution. Lethal injections were however not used until the early 1980s.

Bleyer was also a pioneer of photofluoroscopy, a method of visualizing x-rays to observe the functioning of internal organs. He also introduced the idea of an inhaler for delivering medication into the lungs and considered applications in laryngology that made use of sound recording instruments.

== Early life and education ==
Julius Bleyer was born in Plzeň, Bohemia, Austrian Empire to Jewish parents Samuel and Sophia, who moved to the United States in 1868. He studied at the University of Prague and obtained a medical degree in New York in 1883 from Bellevue Medical College. He obtained an LL.D. in 1896 and practiced in New York from 1883 until his death.

Bleyer was a specialist consultant for the Metropolitan Opera Company from 1888 and dealt with the health of the throat. He served as a vice-president during an American congress on tuberculosis and was a member of the New York Medico-Legal Society.

== Personal life ==
Bleyer married Rose Florsheim in 1884.
