= Antazoline =

Chemical compound

Clinical data
- Trade names: Vasocon-a
- AHFS/Drugs.com: Micromedex Detailed Consumer Information
- Routes of administration: Topical (nasal, eye drops)
- ATC code: R01AC04 (WHO) R06AX05 (WHO)

Legal status
- Legal status: AU: S4 (Prescription only) / Schedule 2

Identifiers
- IUPAC name: N-(4,5-Dihydro-1H-imidazol-2-ylmethyl)-N-(phenylmethyl)aniline
- CAS Number: 91-75-8
- PubChem CID: 2200
- IUPHAR/BPS: 7116
- DrugBank: DB08799
- ChemSpider: 2115
- UNII: DHA8014SS1
- KEGG: D07458
- ChEBI: CHEBI:84115
- ChEMBL: ChEMBL1305
- CompTox Dashboard (EPA): DTXSID3022613
- ECHA InfoCard: 100.001.904

Chemical and physical data
- Formula: C_{17}H_{19}N_{3}
- Molar mass: 265.360 g·mol^{−1}
- 3D model (JSmol): Interactive image
- SMILES: N\1=C(\NCC/1)CN(c2ccccc2)Cc3ccccc3
- InChI: InChI=1S/C17H19N3/c1-3-7-15(8-4-1)13-20(14-17-18-11-12-19-17)16-9-5-2-6-10-16/h1-10H,11-14H2,(H,18,19); Key:REYFJDPCWQRWAA-UHFFFAOYSA-N

Antazoline is a 1st generation antihistamine with anticholinergic properties used to relieve nasal congestion and in eye drops, usually in combination with naphazoline, to relieve the symptoms of allergic conjunctivitis. To treat allergic conjunctivitis, antazoline can be combined in a solution with tetryzoline. The drug is a Histamine H1 receptor antagonist: selectively binding to but not activating the receptor, thereby blocking the actions of endogenous histamine and subsequently leading to the temporary relief of the negative symptoms brought on by histamine.

== Research ==
A 2015 study on people aged 65 years of age or older linked the development of Alzheimer's disease and other forms of dementia to the "higher cumulative" use of first-generation antihistamines, due to their anticholinergic properties.
