= Tixocortol =

Medication

Clinical data
- Other names: (8S,9S,10R,11S,13S,14S,17R)-11,17-dihydroxy-17-(2-mercaptoacetyl)-10,13-dimethyl-6,7,8,9,10,11,12,13,14,15,16,17-dodecahydro-1H-cyclopenta[a]phenanthren-3(2H)-one
- AHFS/Drugs.com: Micromedex Detailed Consumer Information
- ATC code: A07EA05 (WHO) R01AD07 (WHO)

Identifiers
- IUPAC name: (11β)-11,17-Dihydroxy-21-mercaptopregn-4-ene-3,20-dione
- CAS Number: 61951-99-3
- PubChem CID: 162955
- ChemSpider: 143053
- UNII: ZX3KEK657Z
- KEGG: D08610
- CompTox Dashboard (EPA): DTXSID30895062
- ECHA InfoCard: 100.128.190

Chemical and physical data
- Formula: C_{21}H_{30}O_{4}S
- Molar mass: 378.53 g·mol^{−1}
- 3D model (JSmol): Interactive image
- SMILES: O=C4\C=C2/[C@]([C@H]1[C@@H](O)C[C@@]3([C@@](O)(C(=O)CS)CC[C@H]3[C@@H]1CC2)C)(C)CC4
- InChI: InChI=1S/C21H30O4S/c1-19-7-5-13(22)9-12(19)3-4-14-15-6-8-21(25,17(24)11-26)20(15,2)10-16(23)18(14)19/h9,14-16,18,23,25-26H,3-8,10-11H2,1-2H3/t14-,15-,16-,18+,19-,20-,21-/m0/s1; Key:YWDBSCORAARPPF-VWUMJDOOSA-N

Tixocortol is a corticosteroid used as an intestinal anti-inflammatory and decongestant.

== See also ==
- Tixocortol pivalate
