= Tramazoline =

Chemical used as a nasal decongestant

Clinical data
- AHFS/Drugs.com: International Drug Names
- ATC code: R01AA09 (WHO)

Identifiers
- IUPAC name: N-(5,6,7,8-tetrahydronaphthalen-1-yl)-4,5-dihydro-1H-imidazol-2-amine
- CAS Number: 1082-57-1
- PubChem CID: 5524
- ChemSpider: 5323
- UNII: SLE31693IV
- KEGG: D08624
- ChEMBL: ChEMBL32573
- CompTox Dashboard (EPA): DTXSID5046936
- ECHA InfoCard: 100.012.823

Chemical and physical data
- Formula: C_{13}H_{17}N_{3}
- Molar mass: 215.300 g·mol^{−1}

Tramazoline is a chemical that is used in the form of tramazoline hydrochloride in nasal decongestant preparations. It is an α-adrenergic receptor agonist that inhibits secretion of nasal mucus.

It was patented in 1961 and came into medical use in 1962.

== Society and culture ==
=== Brand names ===
- Australia
  - Spray-Tish
  - Rhinaspray
- Austria
  - Rhinorix
- Belgium
  - Rhinospray
- Bulgaria
  - Muconasal Plus
- Czech Republic
  - Muconasal Plus
- Germany
  - Biciron
  - Ellatun
  - Rhinospray
- Hungary
  - Rhinospray Plus
- Italy
  - Rinogutt
  - Fexallegra nasale (Tramazoline + Chlorpheniramine, 1 mg/mL + 3.55 mg/mL)
- The Netherlands
  - Bisolnasal
- Portugal
  - Rhinospray
- Romania
  - Muconasal Plus (older)
  - Muconasal (newer)
- Russia
  - Adrianol (tramazoline + phenylephrine)
  - Lasolvan Rhino
- Spain
  - Rhinospray
- Slovakia
  - Muconasal Plus
- Ukraine
  - Lasorin
