= Metizoline =

Chemical compound

Clinical data
- Trade names: Ellsyl
- Routes of administration: Nasal
- ATC code: R01AA10 (WHO)

Identifiers
- IUPAC name: 2-[(2-methyl-1-benzothien-3-yl)methyl]-4,5-dihydro-1H-imidazole
- CAS Number: 17692-22-7
- PubChem CID: 28688
- ChemSpider: 26683
- UNII: Z27L8N105U
- KEGG: D05006
- CompTox Dashboard (EPA): DTXSID9074983

Chemical and physical data
- Formula: C_{13}H_{14}N_{2}S
- Molar mass: 230.33 g·mol^{−1}
- 3D model (JSmol): Interactive image
- SMILES: CC1=C(C2=CC=CC=C2S1)CC3=NCCN3
- InChI: InChI=1S/C13H14N2S/c1-9-11(8-13-14-6-7-15-13)10-4-2-3-5-12(10)16-9/h2-5H,6-8H2,1H3,(H,14,15); Key:NDNKHWUXXOFHTD-UHFFFAOYSA-N

Metizoline (trade name Ellsyl) is a nasal decongestant against allergic and vasomotor rhinitis.
