= Cafaminol =

Chemical compound

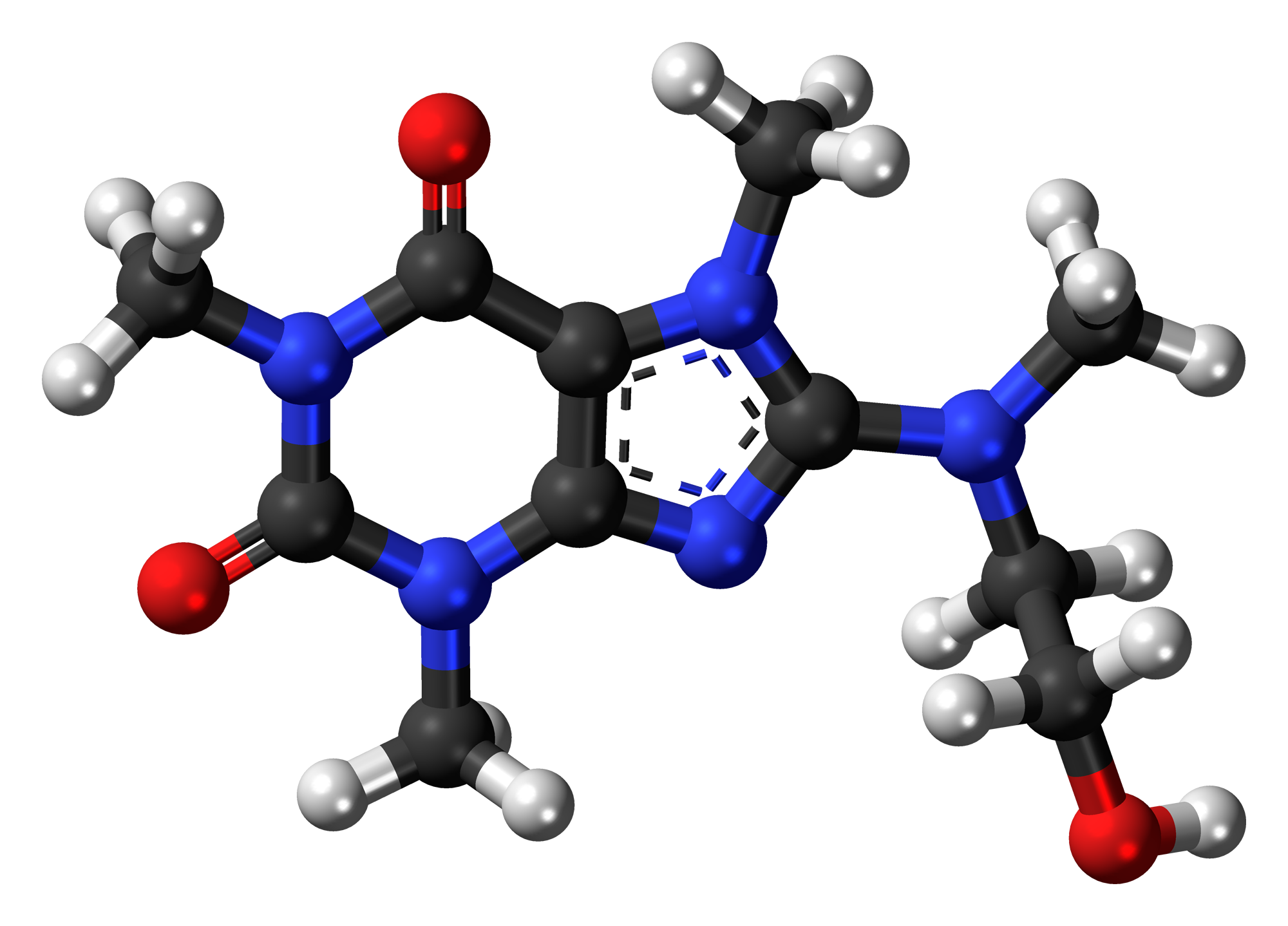

Clinical data
- Trade names: Rhinetten, Rhinoptil
- Other names: Methylcoffanolamine; 8-[(2-Hydroxyethyl)(methyl)amino]caffeine
- ATC code: None

Legal status
- Legal status: In general: ℞ (Prescription only)

Identifiers
- IUPAC name: 8-[(2-hydroxyethyl)(methyl)amino]-1,3,7-trimethyl-3,7-dihydro-1H-purine-2,6-dione
- CAS Number: 30924-31-3
- PubChem CID: 35685
- ChemSpider: 32824
- UNII: 0L1S25NC1L
- ChEMBL: ChEMBL2104570
- CompTox Dashboard (EPA): DTXSID60184916
- ECHA InfoCard: 100.045.795

Chemical and physical data
- Formula: C_{11}H_{17}N_{5}O_{3}
- Molar mass: 267.289 g·mol^{−1}
- 3D model (JSmol): Interactive image
- SMILES: O=C2N(c1nc(n(c1C(=O)N2C)C)N(CCO)C)C
- InChI: InChI=1S/C11H17N5O3/c1-13(5-6-17)10-12-8-7(14(10)2)9(18)16(4)11(19)15(8)3/h17H,5-6H2,1-4H3; Key:ZGNRRVAPHPANFI-UHFFFAOYSA-N

Cafaminol (brand names Rhinetten, Rhinoptil), also known as methylcoffanolamine, is a vasoconstrictor and anticatarrhal of the methylxanthine family related to caffeine which is used as a nasal decongestant in Germany. It was introduced in 1974 and was still in use as of 2000.
