= Tixocortol pivalate =

Names
- IUPAC name S-(11β,17-Dihydroxy-3,20-dioxopregn-4-en-21-yl) 2,2-dimethylpropanethioate
- Systematic IUPAC name S-{2-[(1R,3aS,3bS,9aR,9bS,10S,11aS)-1,10-Dihydroxy-9a,11a-dimethyl-7-oxo-2,3,3a,3b,4,5,7,8,9,9a,9b,10,11,11a-tetradecahydro-1H-cyclopenta[a]phenanthren-1-yl]-2-oxoethyl} 2,2-dimethylpropanethioate

Identifiers
CAS Number	55560-96-8
3D model (JSmol)	Interactive image
ChEBI	CHEBI:63564
ChEMBL	ChEMBL2107112
ChemSpider	16499327
ECHA InfoCard	100.054.261
EC Number	259-706-4
KEGG	D06171
PubChem CID	15052414
UNII	6K28E35M3B
CompTox Dashboard (EPA)	DTXSID30970904
- InChI: InChI=1S/C26H38O5S/c1-23(2,3)22(30)32-14-20(29)26(31)11-9-18-17-7-6-15-12-16(27)8-10-24(15,4)21(17)19(28)13-25(18,26)5/h12,17-19,21,28,31H,6-11,13-14H2,1-5H3/t17-,18-,19-,21+,24-,25-,26-/m0/s1 Key: BISFDZNIUZIKJD-XDANTLIUSA-N
- SMILES: CC12CCC(=O)C=C1CCC3C2C(CC4(C3CCC4(C(=O)CSC(=O)C(C)(C)C)O)C)O

Properties
Chemical formula	C_{26}H_{38}O_{5}S
Molar mass	462.64

Hazards
- GHS labelling
Pictograms	(GHS07: Exclamation mark)
Signal word	Warning
Hazard statements	H317, H413
Precautionary statements	P261, P272, P273, P280, P302+P352, P321, P333+P317, P362+P364, P501
- Except where otherwise noted, data are given for materials in their standard state (at 25 °C [77 °F], 100 kPa). verify (what is ?) Infobox references

Tixocortol pivalate is a corticosteroid. It has anti-inflammatory properties similar to hydrocortisone. It is marketed under the brand name Pivalone.

It is sometimes used in patch testing in atopic dermatitis.

== See also ==
- Tixocortol
