= Tymazoline =

Chemical compound

Clinical data
- Trade names: Thymazen
- AHFS/Drugs.com: International Drug Names
- Routes of administration: Topical (nasal solution)
- ATC code: R01AA13 (WHO)

Identifiers
- IUPAC name: 2-[(5-methyl-2-propan-2-ylphenoxy)methyl]-4,5-dihydro-1H-imidazole
- CAS Number: 24243-97-8
- PubChem CID: 34154
- DrugBank: DB08803
- ChemSpider: 31478
- UNII: U993RH5585
- KEGG: D07373
- CompTox Dashboard (EPA): DTXSID40178939

Chemical and physical data
- Formula: C_{14}H_{20}N_{2}O
- Molar mass: 232.327 g·mol^{−1}
- 3D model (JSmol): Interactive image
- SMILES: Cc1ccc(c2c1cccc2OCC3=NCCN3)C(C)C
- InChI: InChI=1S/C14H20N2O/c1-10(2)12-5-4-11(3)8-13(12)17-9-14-15-6-7-16-14/h4-5,8,10H,6-7,9H2,1-3H3,(H,15,16); Key:QRORCRWSRPKEHR-UHFFFAOYSA-N

Tymazoline (trade name Thymazen in Poland) is a nasal decongestant that can be used to treat rhinitis. It acts as an antihistaminic and sympathomimetic, reducing swelling, inflammation and mucosal secretions.
