= Umeclidinium bromide =

Chemical compound

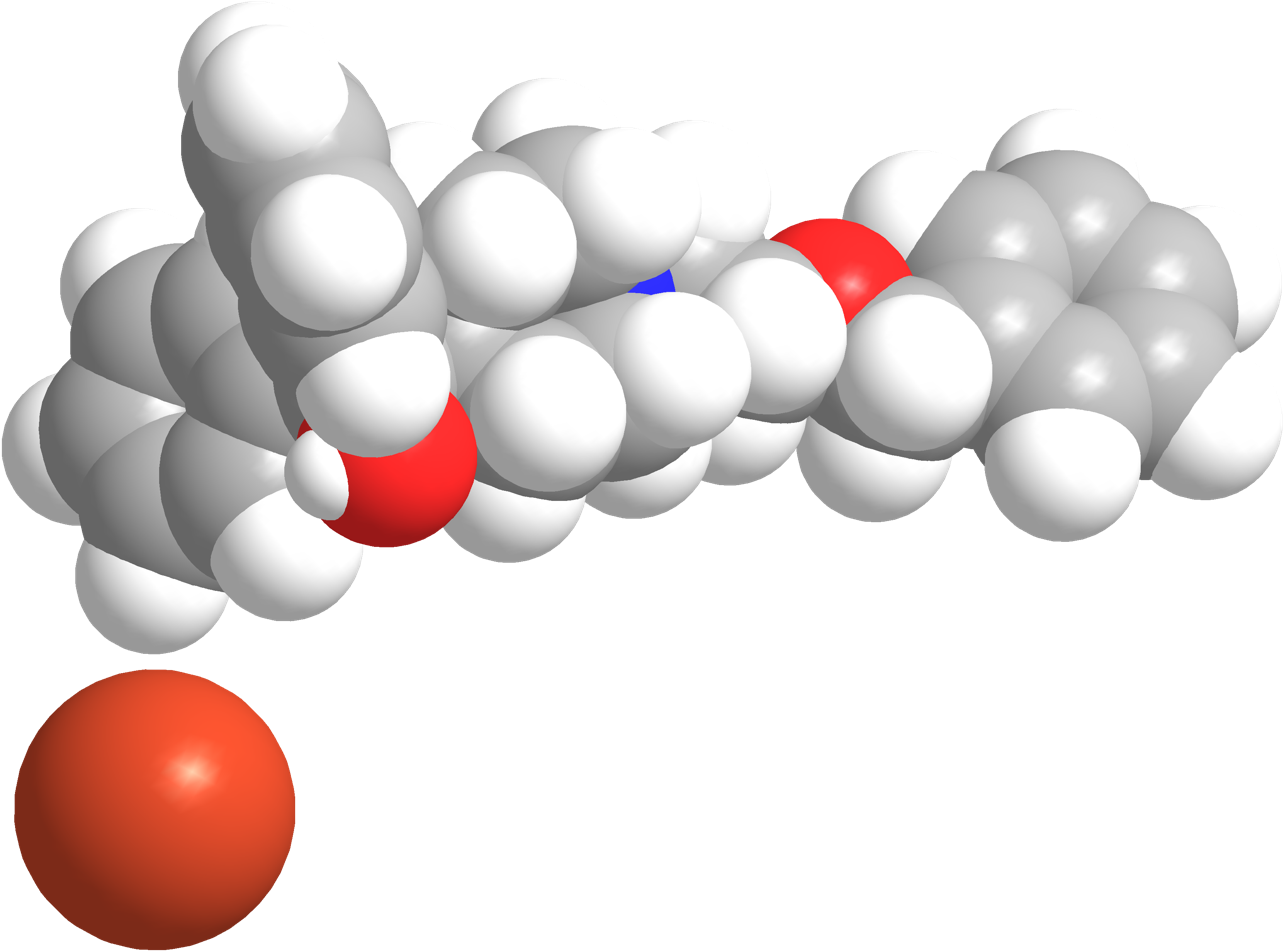

Clinical data
- Trade names: Incruse Ellipta
- Other names: GSK573719A
- License data: US DailyMed: Umeclidinium bromide
- Routes of administration: Inhalation (DPI)
- ATC code: R03BB07 (WHO) R03AL03 (WHO) (+vilanterol)

Legal status
- Legal status: AU: S4 (Prescription only); CA: ℞-only; UK: POM (Prescription only); US: ℞-only; EU: Rx-only; In general: ℞ (Prescription only)

Pharmacokinetic data
- Protein binding: ~89%
- Metabolism: Liver (CYP2D6)
- Elimination half-life: 11 hours
- Excretion: Feces (58%) and urine (22%)

Identifiers
- IUPAC name: Diphenyl-[1-(2-phenylmethoxyethyl)-1-azoniabicyclo[2.2.2]octan-4-yl]methanol bromide
- CAS Number: 869113-09-7
- PubChem CID: 11519069
- DrugBank: DB09076
- ChemSpider: 9693857
- UNII: 7AN603V4JV
- KEGG: D10181
- ChEBI: CHEBI:79040
- CompTox Dashboard (EPA): DTXSID50235966
- ECHA InfoCard: 100.166.375

Chemical and physical data
- Formula: C_{29}H_{34}BrNO_{2}
- Molar mass: 508.500 g·mol^{−1}
- 3D model (JSmol): Interactive image
- SMILES: OC(c1ccccc1)(c1ccccc1)C12CC[N+](CCOCc3ccccc3)(CC1)CC2.[Br-]
- InChI: InChI=1S/C29H34NO2.BrH/c31-29(26-12-6-2-7-13-26,27-14-8-3-9-15-27)28-16-19-30(20-17-28,21-18-28)22-23-32-24-25-10-4-1-5-11-25;/h1-15,31H,16-24H2;1H/q+1;/p-1; Key:PEJHHXHHNGORMP-UHFFFAOYSA-M

Umeclidinium bromide, sold under the brand name Incruse Ellipta among others, is a long-acting muscarinic antagonist approved for the maintenance treatment of chronic obstructive pulmonary disease (COPD). It is also approved for this indication in combination with vilanterol (as umeclidinium bromide/vilanterol), and also as a triple-therapy combination as fluticasone furoate/umeclidinium bromide/vilanterol.

It is on the World Health Organization's List of Essential Medicines. In 2020, it was the 245th most commonly prescribed medication in the United States, with more than 1 million prescriptions.
