= Flunisolide =

Chemical compound

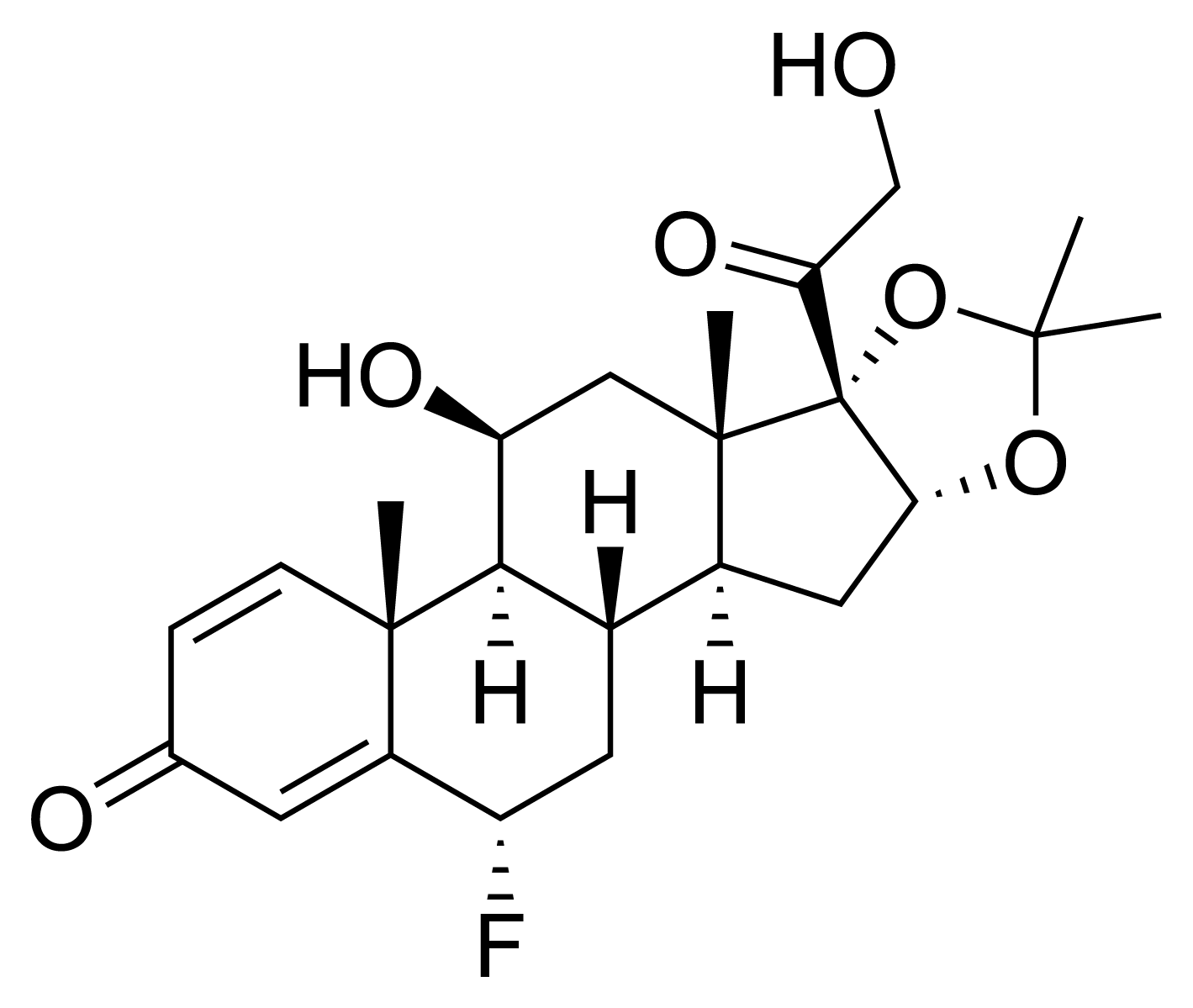

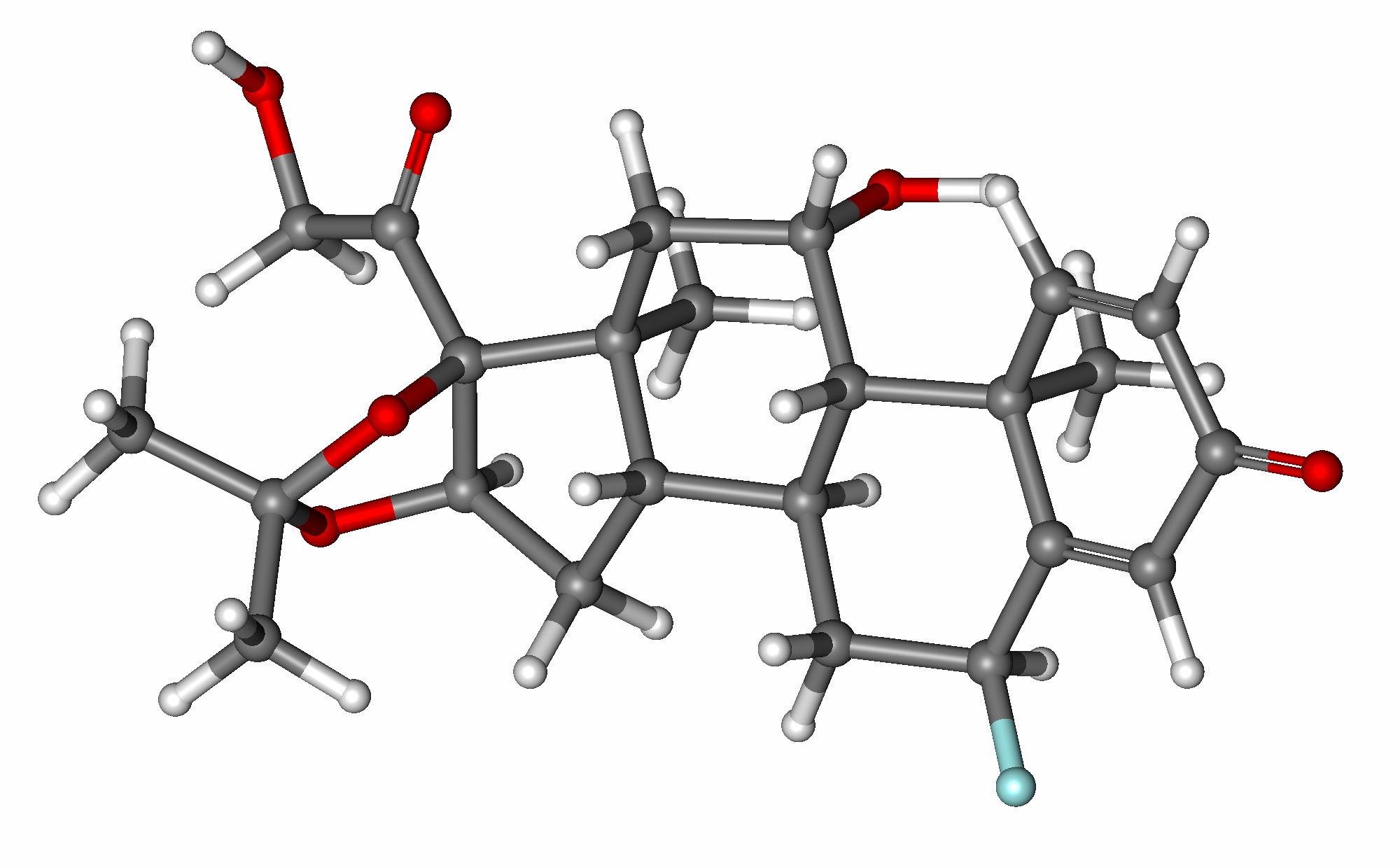

Clinical data
- Trade names: Aerobid, Nasalide, Nasarel, others
- Other names: 6α-Fluoro-11β,16α,17,21-tetrahydroxypregna-1,4-diene-3,20-dione acetone cyclic 16,17-acetal
- AHFS/Drugs.com: Monograph
- MedlinePlus: a681048
- Routes of administration: Inhaled
- ATC code: R01AD04 (WHO) R03BA03 (WHO)

Pharmacokinetic data
- Protein binding: 40% after inhalation
- Elimination half-life: 1.8 hours

Identifiers
- IUPAC name: (1S,2S,4R,8S,9S,11S,12S,13R,19S)-19-fluoro-11-hydroxy-8-(2-hydroxyacetyl)-6,6,9,13-tetramethyl-5,7-dioxapentacyclo[10.8.0.0^{2,9}.0^{4,8}.0^{13,18}]icosa-14,17-dien-16-one
- CAS Number: 3385-03-3
- PubChem CID: 82153
- IUPHAR/BPS: 7076
- DrugBank: DB00180
- ChemSpider: 74144
- UNII: 78M02AA8KF
- KEGG: D00324
- ChEBI: CHEBI:5106
- ChEMBL: ChEMBL1512
- CompTox Dashboard (EPA): DTXSID1045534
- ECHA InfoCard: 100.020.177

Chemical and physical data
- Formula: C_{24}H_{31}FO_{6}
- Molar mass: 434.504 g·mol^{−1}
- 3D model (JSmol): Interactive image
- SMILES: O=C\1\C=C/[C@]2(/C(=C/1)[C@@H](F)C[C@H]3[C@H]4[C@](C[C@H](O)[C@H]23)([C@@]5(OC(O[C@@H]5C4)(C)C)C(=O)CO)C)C
- InChI: InChI=1S/C24H31FO6/c1-21(2)30-19-9-14-13-8-16(25)15-7-12(27)5-6-22(15,3)20(13)17(28)10-23(14,4)24(19,31-21)18(29)11-26/h5-7,13-14,16-17,19-20,26,28H,8-11H2,1-4H3/t13-,14-,16-,17-,19+,20+,22-,23-,24+/m0/s1; Key:XSFJVAJPIHIPKU-XWCQMRHXSA-N

Flunisolide (marketed as AeroBid among others) is a corticosteroid often prescribed as a treatment for allergic rhinitis. Intranasal corticosteroids are the most effective medication for controlling symptoms.

Flunisolide's principal mechanism of action is to activate glucocorticoid receptors, indicating an anti-inflammatory action. The effects of topical corticosteroids are not immediate and must be used for at least a few days for noticeable relief. As-needed use is less effective than regular recommended use. Flunisolide should not be used for nasal infections. It should not be continued if symptoms are not relieved after regular use for over two to three weeks.

Patented in 1958 and approved for medical use in 1978, it is on the World Health Organization's List of Essential Medicines.

== Side effects ==
Temporary nose and throat dryness, irritation, bleeding, or unpleasant taste or smell may occur. Nasal septum perforation has been rarely reported. Rare but localized infections of the nose and pharynx with Candida albicans have also been reported. Its long-term use may raise the chances of cataracts or glaucoma.

Flunisolide nasal spray is absorbed into the circulatory system (blood). Corticosteroid nasal sprays may affect the hypothalamic-pituitary-adrenal axis function in humans. After obtaining the desired clinical effect, the maintenance dose should be reduced to the smallest amount required to control the symptoms. The amount can be as low as one spray in each nostril daily. Utilizing the minimum effective dose reduces possibility of side effects. Recommended amounts of intranasal corticosteroids are generally not associated with systemic side effects.

Corticosteroids inhibit wound healing, so corticosteroid nasal sprays should be used cautiously in patients who have experienced recent nasal septal ulcers, recurrent epistaxis, nasal surgery or trauma, until healing. In pregnancy, recommended doses of intranasal corticosteroids are safe and effective.
