= Clobetasone =

Chemical compound

Clinical data
- Trade names: Eumovate
- Other names: (8S,9R,10S,13S,14S,16S,17R)-17-(2-Chloroacetyl)-9-fluoro-17-hydroxy-10,13,16-trimethyl-7,8,12,14,15,16-hexahydro-6H-cyclopenta[a]phenanthrene-3,11-dione
- AHFS/Drugs.com: Micromedex Detailed Consumer Information
- Routes of administration: topical
- ATC code: D07AB01 (WHO) S01BA09 (WHO)

Identifiers
- IUPAC name: (1R,2S,10S,11S,13S,14R,15S)-14-(2-chloroacetyl)-1-fluoro-14-hydroxy-2,13,15-trimethyltetracyclo[8.7.0.0^{2,7}.0^{11,15}]heptadeca-3,6-diene-5,17-dione
- CAS Number: 54063-32-0
- PubChem CID: 71387
- ChemSpider: 64482
- UNII: LT69WY1J6D
- KEGG: D07717
- CompTox Dashboard (EPA): DTXSID601023875
- ECHA InfoCard: 100.053.576

Chemical and physical data
- Formula: C_{22}H_{26}ClFO_{4}
- Molar mass: 408.89 g·mol^{−1}
- 3D model (JSmol): Interactive image
- SMILES: ClCC(=O)[C@@]2(O)[C@@H](C)C[C@H]1[C@H]4[C@](F)(C(=O)C[C@@]12C)[C@@]/3(/C(=C\C(=O)\C=C\3)CC4)C
- InChI: InChI=1S/C22H26ClFO4/c1-12-8-16-15-5-4-13-9-14(25)6-7-19(13,2)21(15,24)17(26)10-20(16,3)22(12,28)18(27)11-23/h6-7,9,12,15-16,28H,4-5,8,10-11H2,1-3H3/t12-,15-,16-,19-,20-,21-,22-/m0/s1; Key:XXIFVOHLGBURIG-OZCCCYNHSA-N

Clobetasone (INN) is a corticosteroid used in dermatology, for treating such skin inflammation as seen in eczema, psoriasis and other forms of dermatitis, and ophthalmology. Topical clobetasone butyrate has shown minimal suppression of the hypothalamic–pituitary–adrenal axis.

It is available as clobetasone butyrate under the brand names Eumosone or Eumovate both manufactured by GlaxoSmithKline.

Trimovate also contains oxytetracycline, an antibiotic, and nystatin, an antifungal.

== Uses ==
In dermatology, topical clobetasone butyrate helps to reduce the itchiness and erythema associated with eczema and dermatitis.

In ophthalmology, clobetasone butyrate 0.1% eye drops have been shown to be safe and effective in the treatment of dry eyes in Sjögren syndrome. Sjögren syndrome is an autoimmune disorder that affects the moisture producing glands of the body causing many symptoms including dry eyes. When compared to other corticosteroid eye drops, clobetasone butyrate showed only minimal rises in intraocular pressure. Increased pressure within the eye can lead to glaucoma.

== Adverse effects ==
Side effects associated with clobetasone cream and ointment include: burning, irritation, itching, thinning of the skin, and changes in skin color.

== Contraindications ==
The following should not be treated with clobetasone with nystatin and oxytetracycline:

- Patients with known history of hypersensitivity to clobetasone butyrate, nystatin, oxytetracycline or any components of the formulation
- Primary cutaneous viral infections (Common viral skin infections include herpes simplex virus infection, herpes zoster, cutaneous and genital warts, and molluscum contagiosum.)
- Primary infected skin lesions caused by infection with fungi, bacteria or yeasts (Fungal infections of the skin commonly seen in family practice include the various forms of tinea: tinea corporis, tinea gladiatorum, tinea cruris, tinea pedis, tinea capitis, and tinea unguium (e.g., onychomycosis).)
- Cutaneous infections caused by Acinetobacter species (implicated in many hospital-acquired infections such as bacteremia, urinary tract infections (UTIs), secondary meningitis, infective endocarditis, and wound and burn infections.), methicillin resistant Staphylococcus aureus (MRSA), Pseudomonas species, Proteus species Serratia species or Group B streptococcal infection (Streptococcus B., Group B streptococcal infection, also known as Group B streptococcal disease or just Group B strep, is the infection caused by the bacterium Streptococcus agalactiae (S. agalactiae) also known as group B streptococcus or GBS)
- Rosacea
- Acne vulgaris
- Pruritus without inflammation

=== Serious Contraindications ===
- Pseudomembranous colitis - C. Diff. Colitis, also called: Clostridioides difficile colitis, or Pseudomembranous colitis has been reported with the use of antibiotics and may range in severity from mild to life-threatening.
- Reversible hypothalamic-pituitary-adrenal (HPA) axis suppression - Manifestations of hypercortisolism (Cushing's syndrome) and reversible hypothalamic-pituitary-adrenal (HPA) axis suppression can occur in some individuals as a result of increased systemic absorption of topical corticosteroids. (The hypothalamic–pituitary–adrenal (HPA) axis is the complex relationship between the hypothalamus, the pituitary gland, and the adrenals; was previously called Adrenal Fatigue.)

== See also ==
- Clobetasone butyrate
- Clobetasol propionate
