= Umeclidinium bromide/vilanterol =

Pharmaceutical medication

- Umeclidinium bromide (TOP), vilanterol (BOTTOM)

Combination of
- Umeclidinium bromide: Muscarinic antagonist
- Vilanterol: Ultra-long-acting β_{2} agonist

Clinical data
- Trade names: Anoro Ellipta, others
- AHFS/Drugs.com: Professional Drug Facts
- License data: US DailyMed: Anoro
- Pregnancy category: AU: B3
- Routes of administration: Inhalation
- ATC code: R03AL03 (WHO)

Legal status
- Legal status: AU: S4 (Prescription only); UK: POM (Prescription only); US: ℞-only; EU: Rx-only

Identifiers
- CAS Number: 2446159-58-4
- KEGG: D10533

Umeclidinium bromide/vilanterol, sold under the brand name Anoro Ellipta, among others, is a fixed-dose combination medication for the treatment of chronic obstructive pulmonary disease (COPD). It is administered by inhalation.

The most common side effects include upper respiratory tract infections, urinary tract infections, pharyngitis, sinusitis, nasopharyngitis, headache, cough, oropharyngeal pain, constipation and dry mouth.

In 2022, it was the 211th most commonly prescribed medication in the United States, with more than 1 million prescriptions.
