= Dry-powder inhaler =

Device that delivers medication to the lungs in the form of a dry powder

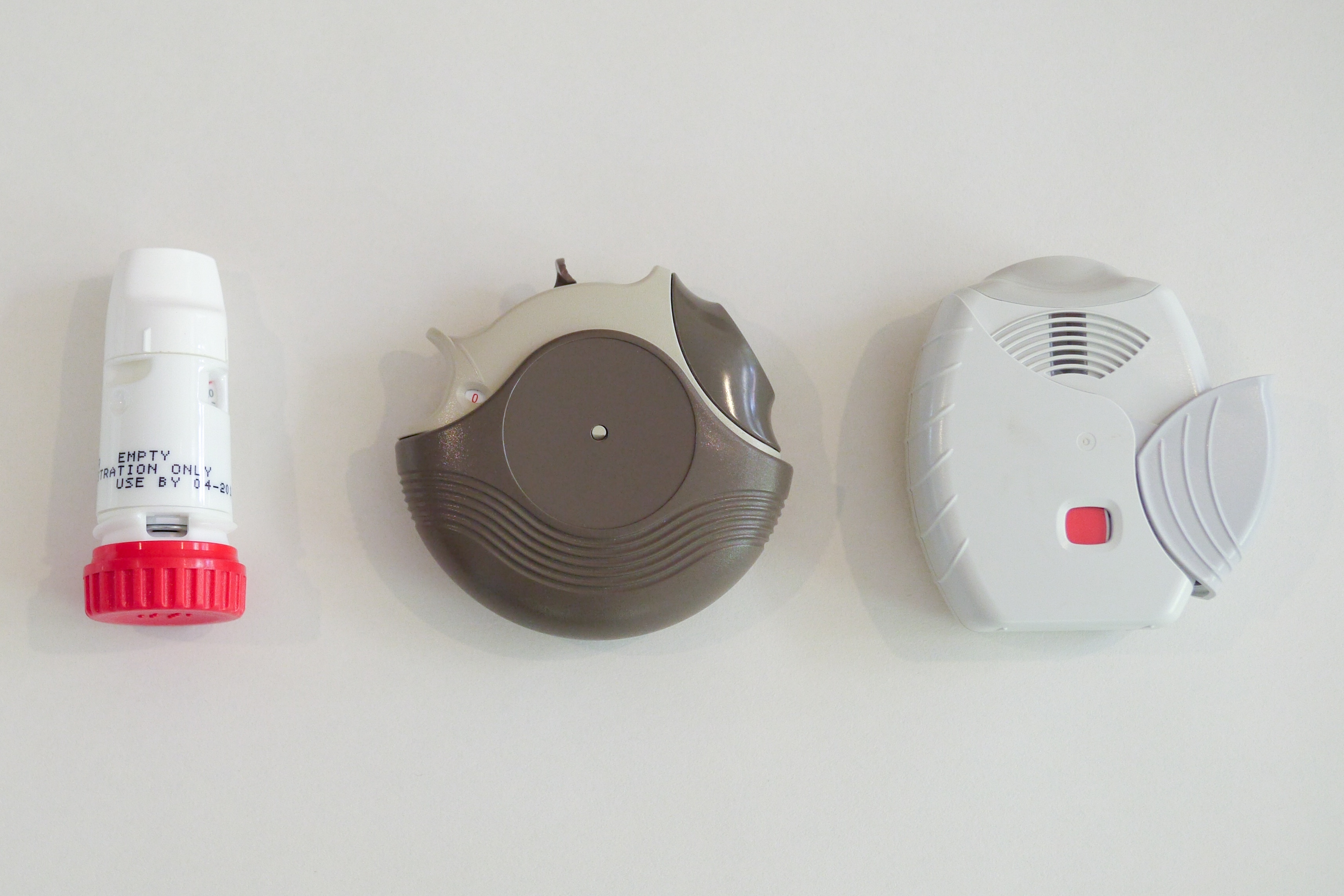
Three types of dry powder inhalers: Turbuhaler, Accuhaler and Ellipta devices.

A dry-powder inhaler (DPI) is a device that delivers medication to the lungs in the form of a dry powder. DPIs are commonly used to treat respiratory diseases such as asthma, bronchitis, emphysema, and COPD, although DPIs (such as inhalable insulin) have also been used in the treatment of diabetes mellitus.

DPIs are an alternative to the aerosol-based inhalers commonly called metered-dose inhalers (MDIs). DPIs may require some procedure to allow a measured dose of powder to be ready for the patient to take. The medication is commonly held either in a capsule for manual loading or in a proprietary form inside the inhaler. Once loaded or actuated, the operator puts the mouthpiece of the inhaler into their mouth and takes a sharp, deep inhalation (ensuring that the medication reaches the lower parts of the lungs), holding their breath for 5–10 seconds.

Most DPIs rely on the force of patient inhalation to entrain powder from the device and subsequently break up the powder into particles that are small enough to reach the lungs. For this reason, insufficient patient inhalation flow rates may lead to reduced dose delivery and incomplete deaggregation of the powder, leading to unsatisfactory device performance. Because most DPIs have a minimum inspiratory effort that is needed for proper use, they are normally used only in older children and adults.

== Inhaler technique and use ==
While DPIs are commonly used in the treatment of lung-based disorders, their use requires dexterity to complete the required sequential steps to achieve application of these devices. Incorrect completion of one or more steps in the use of a DPI can substantially reduce the delivery of the administrated medication and consequently its effectiveness and safety. Numerous studies have demonstrated that between 50–100% of patients do not use their inhaler devices correctly, with patients often unaware that they are using their inhaled medication incorrectly. Incorrect inhaler technique has been associated with poorer outcomes.

== Lactose ==
Some powder inhalers use lactose to:

1. Carry the fine particles of the active pharmaceutical ingredient (which must be fine to reach its target)
2. Improve the flow-ability of the powder during manufacturing and to aid handling
3. Act as a bulking agent
4. Aid in powder uptake from the device during inhalation and aerosolization

It has been suggested that this may be harmful to lactose intolerant people, and some doctors advise patients not to use lactose-containing DPIs to minimize the risk of hypersensitivity reactions.

== Storage ==
DPI medication must be stored in a dry place in a temperature of not more than 25 °C (77 °F) and humidity between 40 and 50% in sealed packaging, since exposure of the powder to moisture degrades the ability of the device to disperse its medication as a fine powder upon inhalation. Some medication also needs photo protection.

== See also ==
- Nebulizer
