= Fluticasone propionate =

Glucocorticoid medication

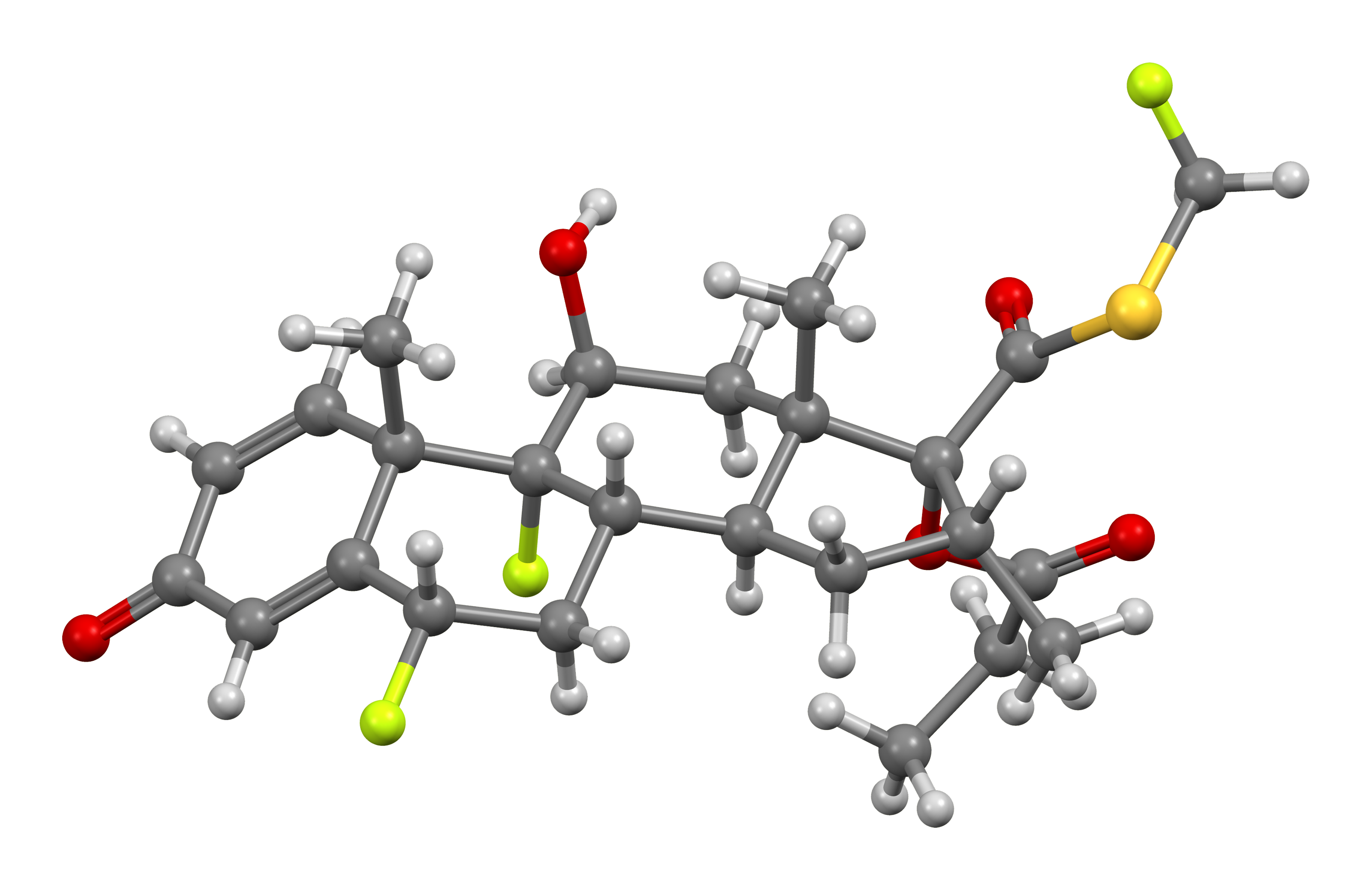

Clinical data
- Trade names: Flovent, Flixotide, Flonase, others
- AHFS/Drugs.com: Monograph
- MedlinePlus: a695002
- License data: US DailyMed: Fluticasone propionate
- Pregnancy category: AU: B3
- Routes of administration: Intranasal, inhalation, topical
- Drug class: Glucocorticoid
- ATC code: D07AC17 (WHO) R01AD08 (WHO) R03BA05 (WHO) R01AD58 (WHO)

Legal status
- Legal status: AU: S4 (Prescription only); CA: ℞-only; UK: P (Pharmacy medicines) / POM (Prescription); US: OTC / Rx-only

Pharmacokinetic data
- Bioavailability: 0.51% (Intranasal)
- Protein binding: 91%
- Metabolism: Intranasal; Liver (CYP3A4-mediated)
- Elimination half-life: 10 hours
- Excretion: Kidney

Identifiers
- IUPAC name: S-(fluoromethyl)-6α,9-difluoro-11β, 17-dihydroxy-16α-methyl-3-oxoandrosta-1, 4-diene-17β-carbothioate, 17-propanoate
- CAS Number: 80474-14-2
- PubChem CID: 444036
- IUPHAR/BPS: 7080
- DrugBank: DB00588
- ChemSpider: 392059
- UNII: O2GMZ0LF5W
- KEGG: D01708
- ChEBI: CHEBI:31441
- ChEMBL: ChEMBL1473
- CompTox Dashboard (EPA): DTXSID8045511
- ECHA InfoCard: 100.129.097

Chemical and physical data
- Formula: C_{25}H_{31}F_{3}O_{5}S
- Molar mass: 500.57 g·mol^{−1}
- 3D model (JSmol): Interactive image
- SMILES: CCC(=O)OC1(C(CC2C1(CC(C3(C2CC(C4=CC(=O)C=CC43C)F)F)O)C)C)C(=O)SCF
- InChI: InChI=1S/C25H31F3O5S/c1-5-20(31)33-25(21(32)34-12-26)13(2)8-15-16-10-18(27)17-9-14(29)6-7-22(17,3)24(16,28)19(30)11-23(15,25)4/h6-7,9,13,15-16,18-19,30H,5,8,10-12H2,1-4H3/t13-,15+,16+,18+,19+,22+,23+,24+,25+/m1/s1; Key:WMWTYOKRWGGJOA-CENSZEJFSA-N

Fluticasone propionate, sold under the brand names Flovent and Flonase among others, is a glucocorticoid steroid medication. When inhaled it is used for the long term management of asthma and chronic obstructive pulmonary disease (COPD). In the nose it is used for hay fever and nasal polyps. It can also be used for mouth ulcers.

Common side effects when inhaled include upper respiratory tract infections, sinusitis, thrush, and cough. Common side effects when used in the nose include nosebleeding and sore throat. Unlike fluticasone furoate, which is approved in children as young as two years of age when used for allergies, fluticasone propionate is only approved for children four years and older.

Fluticasone propionate was patented in 1980, and approved for medical use in 1990. It is available as a generic medication. In 2023, fluticasone was the 26th most commonly prescribed medication in the United States, with more than 21 million prescriptions.

== Medical uses ==
Fluticasone propionate is used by powder or aerosol inhalation for the prophylaxis of asthma. The nasal spray is used for prevention and treatment of allergic rhinitis. Nasal drops are used in the treatment of nasal polyps. The nasal spray can also be used in the mouth for mouth ulcers.

Fluticasone propionate in a topical form can be used to treat skin conditions such as eczema, psoriasis, and rashes.

== Adverse effects ==
The nasal spray and oral inhaler formulation have fewer corticosteroid side effects than the tablet formulation because they limit systemic (blood) absorption. However, systemic absorption is not negligible even with correct administration. Using the spray or inhaler at higher than recommended doses or with other corticosteroids can increase the risk for serious, systemic corticosteroid induced side effects. These side effects include weakened immune system, increased risk of systemic infections, osteoporosis, and elevated pressure in the eyes.

=== Nasal spray ===
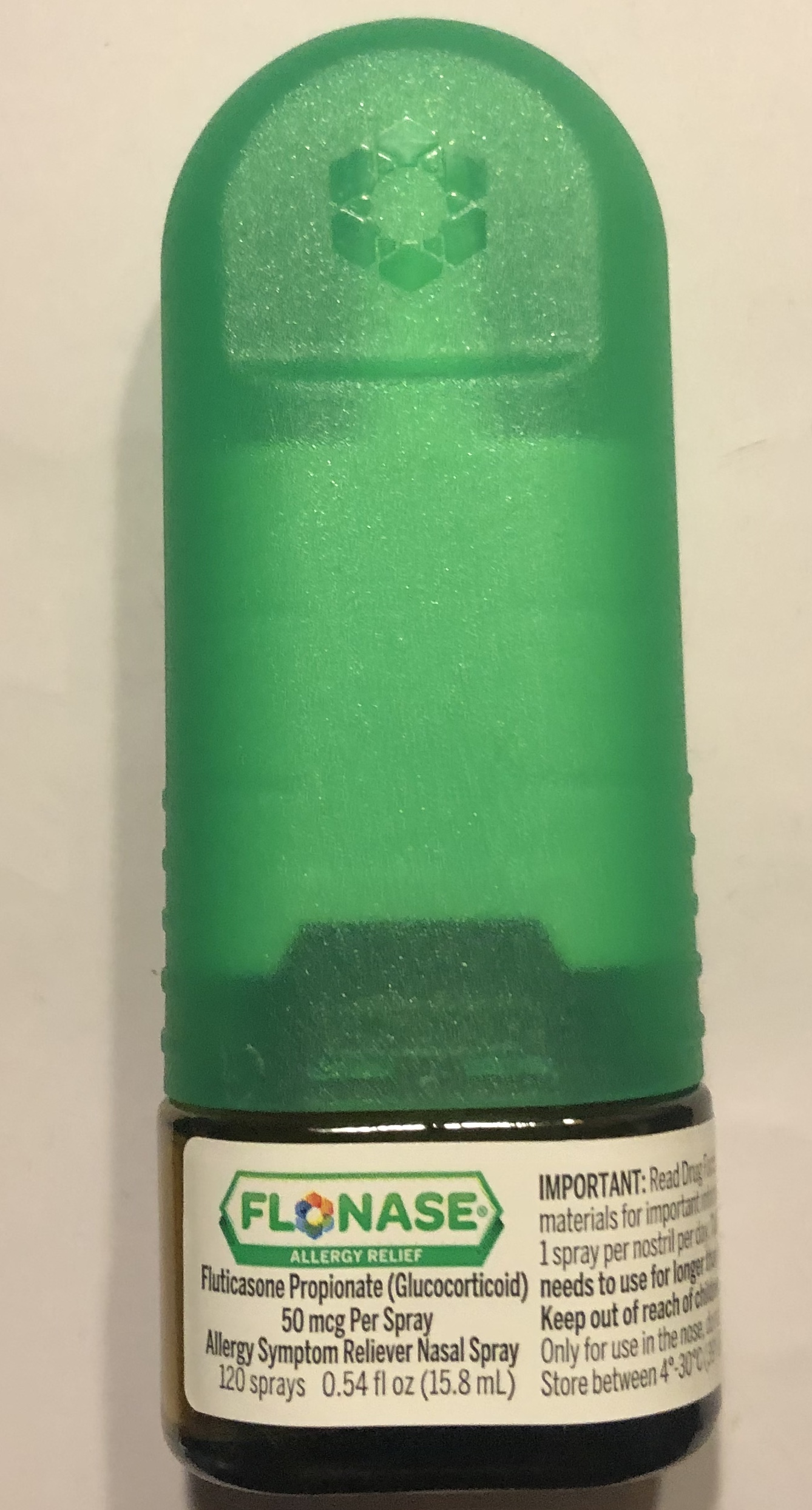
Flonase brand nasal spray

Common side effects may include nasal irritation (burning, stinging, bleeding), headache, upset stomach (nausea, vomiting), and diarrhea. Rare side effects include infection (evidenced by, for example, fever, sore throat, and cough), vision problems, severe swelling, hoarse voice, and difficulty breathing or swallowing.

=== Inhaled ===
Common side effects may include upper respiratory tract infection, throat irritation, thrush, cough, and headache. Rare side effects include bruising, swelling of the face/neck, depression, tiredness, and shortness of breath.

== Pharmacology ==
Fluticasone propionate is a highly selective agonist at the glucocorticoid receptor with negligible activity at androgen, estrogen, or mineralocorticoid receptors, thereby producing anti-inflammatory and vasoconstriction effects. It has been shown to have a wide range of inhibitory effects on multiple cell types (e.g., mast cell, eosinophil, neutrophil, macrophages, and lymphocytes) and mediators (e.g., histamine, eicosanoids, leukotrienes, and cytokines) involved in inflammation. Fluticasone propionate is stated to exert a topical effect on the lungs without significant systemic effects at usual doses, due to its low systemic bioavailability.

== Interactions ==
Fluticasone propionate is broken down by CYP3A4 (cytochrome P450 3A4), and has been shown to interact with strong CYP3A4 inhibitors such as ritonavir and ketoconazole. Coadministration of ritonavir and fluticasone may lead to increased levels of fluticasone in the body, which may lead to Cushing's syndrome and adrenal insufficiency. Ketoconazole, an antifungal drug, has been shown to increase fluticasone concentration leading to systemic corticosteroid side effects.

== Society and culture ==
In 2024, GSK plc removed Flovent from the market and replaced it with an authorized generic.
