= Fluticasone furoate/vilanterol =

Pharmaceutical drug formulation

Combination of
- Fluticasone furoate: Corticosteroid
- Vilanterol: Ultra-long-acting β_{2} agonist

Clinical data
- Trade names: Breo Ellipta, Relvar Ellipta, others
- Other names: FF/VI
- AHFS/Drugs.com: breo-ellipta
- License data: US DailyMed: Fluticasone and vilanterol
- Routes of administration: Inhalation
- ATC code: R03AK10 (WHO)

Legal status
- Legal status: AU: S4 (Prescription only); UK: POM (Prescription only); US: ℞-only; EU: Rx-only; In general: ℞ (Prescription only)

Identifiers
- KEGG: D10501

Fluticasone furoate/vilanterol, sold under the brand names Breo Ellipta and Relvar Ellipta among others, is a combination medication for the treatment of chronic obstructive pulmonary disease (COPD) and asthma. It contains fluticasone furoate, an inhaled corticosteroid, and vilanterol, an ultra-long-acting β_{2} agonist (ultra-LABA).

In 2013, the drug was approved for use in the United States by the Food and Drug Administration (FDA) for long-term maintenance treatment of airflow obstruction in people with COPD, including chronic bronchitis and emphysema, and the European Medicines Agency approved it as a second-line therapy for the treatment of COPD and asthma. There were, however, concerns that LABAs such as vilanterol increase the risk of deaths due to asthma. In 2017, the FDA states that they were not justified.

It is on the World Health Organization's List of Essential Medicines. In 2023, it was the 139th most commonly prescribed medication in the United States, with more than 4 million prescriptions.

== History ==
=== Approval ===
The combination was approved by the FDA for use as a long-term, once-daily, maintenance treatment in people with COPD in 2013. The FDA label was changed in April 2015, to add an indication for a once-daily treatment of asthma in people aged 18 years of age and older. The exclusivity for a new product ended in May 2016, in the United States, and the exclusivity on the indication for asthma expired on 30 April 2018. The patent for both indications expired in August 2021. The European Medicines Agency authorized the combination for marketing in November 2013.

== Society and culture ==
=== Commercial information ===
GlaxoSmithKline manufactures the combination. As of December 2015, fluticasone furoate/vilanterol inhalation powder was approved for marketing in 73 countries, and had been launched in 45 countries. Within the brand name, the Ellipta is the dry powder inhaler that the medication is administered in. Innoviva developed the active substance vilanterol, and receives royalties on sales.

== Research ==
There is tentative evidence as of 2016, that it is better than placebo for asthma. Evidence is less strong in children.
