= C11H14N4O4 =

The molecular formula C_{11}H_{14}N_{4}O_{4} (molar mass: 266.253 g/mol, exact mass: 266.1015 u) may refer to:

- Doxofylline
- Forodesine
- Tubercidin
