= Respiratory pharmacology =

There are several categories of respiratory drugs, each specific to a drug's purpose and mode of action. The following is a list of key pharmaceuticals in the prevention and treatment of respiratory-related ailments.

== Adrenergic (Sympathomimetic) Bronchodilators ==
=== Ultra Short-Acting ===
- Epinephrine
- Racemic epinephrine
- Isoetharine

=== Short-Acting ===
- Metaproterenol
- Albuterol
- Pirbuterol
- Levalbuterol

=== Long-Acting ===
- Salmeterol
- Formoterol
- Arformoterol

=== Anticholinergic (Parasympatholytic) Bronchodilators ===
- Ipratropium bromide
- Tiotropium bromide

=== Xanthines ===
- Theophylline
- Oxtriphylline
- Aminophylline
- Dyphylline

=== Mucus-controlling agents ===
- Acetylcysteine (10%,20%)
- Dornase alfa
- Hypertonic saline (3-10%)

=== Surfactants ===
- Beractant
- Calfactant
- Poractant alfa

=== Corticosteroids ===
- Beclomethasone (dipropionate)
- Triamcinolone acetonide
- Flunisolide (hemihydrate)
- Fluticasone (propionate)
- Budesonide
- Mometasone furoate

=== Nonsteroidal Antiasthma agents ===
==== Cromolyn-like agents ====
- Cromolyn sodium
- Nedocromil sodium

==== Antileukotrienes ====
- Zafirlukast
- Montelukast
- Zileuton

==== Monoclonal Antibody ====
- Omalizumab

=== Aerosolized Antiinfective agents ===
- Pentamidine isethionate
- Ribavirin
- Tobramycin
- Zanamivir

=== Smoking Cessation Drugs ===
- Nicotine transdermal (patch)
- Nicotine polacrilex
- Bupropion
- Varenicline

=== Other Important Respiratory Medications ===
- α_{1}-Proteinase Inhibitors
- Nitric Oxide (gas)
- Heliox (gas)
- Epoprostenol
