= Budesonide/glycopyrronium bromide/formoterol =

Combination drug

Combination of
- Budesonide: Inhaled corticosteroid
- Glycopyrronium bromide: Anticholinergic muscarinic antagonist
- Formoterol: Long-acting β_{2} agonist

Clinical data
- Trade names: Breztri Aerosphere, Trixeo Aerosphere, Riltrava Aerosphere
- Other names: Budesonide/glycopyrrolate/formoterol fumarate
- AHFS/Drugs.com: Professional Drug Facts
- License data: US DailyMed: Breztri
- Routes of administration: By mouth (inhalation)
- ATC code: R03AL11 (WHO)

Legal status
- Legal status: CA: ℞-only; UK: POM (Prescription only); US: ℞-only; EU: Rx-only

Identifiers
- CAS Number: 2588185-76-4
- KEGG: D11584

Budesonide/glycopyrronium bromide/formoterol, sold under the brand name Breztri Aerosphere among others, is an inhalable fixed-dose combination medication for the treatment of chronic obstructive pulmonary disease (COPD). It contains budesonide, glycopyrronium bromide, and formoterol fumarate dihydrate. It is inhaled.

The most common side effects include oral candidiasis (a fungal infection of the mouth), upper respiratory tract infection, pneumonia, back pain, muscle spasms, influenza, urinary tract infection, cough, sinusitis, and diarrhea. Headache is also a common side effect.

The combination was approved for medical use in the United States in July 2020, and in the European Union in December 2020.

== Medical uses ==
Budesonide/glycopyrronium bromide/formoterol is indicated for the maintenance treatment of chronic obstructive pulmonary disease (COPD) in adults.

== Society and culture ==
=== Legal status ===
Trixeo Aerosphere was authorized for medical use in the European Union in December 2020. Riltrava Aerosphere was authorized for medical use in the European Union in January 2022.

=== Propellant ===
In 2025, a new budesonide/glycopyrronium bromide/formoterol inhaler using the propellant HFO-1234ze(E) was approved in the United Kingdom, for the treatment of COPD.

In July 2025, the European Medicines Agency recommended a change in the composition of Trixeo Aerosphere and its duplicate product Riltrava Aerosphere to replace the existing gas propellant with a low global warming potential gas alternative. The low global warming potential alternative propellant has a 1000-fold reduction in global warming potential and similar physical properties.

== See also ==
- Glycopyrronium bromide/formoterol
