= Beclometasone/formoterol/glycopyrronium bromide =

Combination drug

Combination of
- Beclometasone dipropionate: Glucocorticoid
- Formoterol fumarate dihydrate: Long-acting β_{2} agonist
- Glycopyrronium bromide: Antimuscarinic

Clinical data
- Trade names: Trimbow, others
- AHFS/Drugs.com: trimbow
- License data: US DailyMed: Trimbow
- Routes of administration: Inhalation
- ATC code: R03AL09 (WHO)

Legal status
- Legal status: AU: S4 (Prescription only); UK: POM (Prescription only); US: ℞-only; EU: Rx-only; In general: ℞ (Prescription only)

Identifiers
- CAS Number: 2447629-85-6

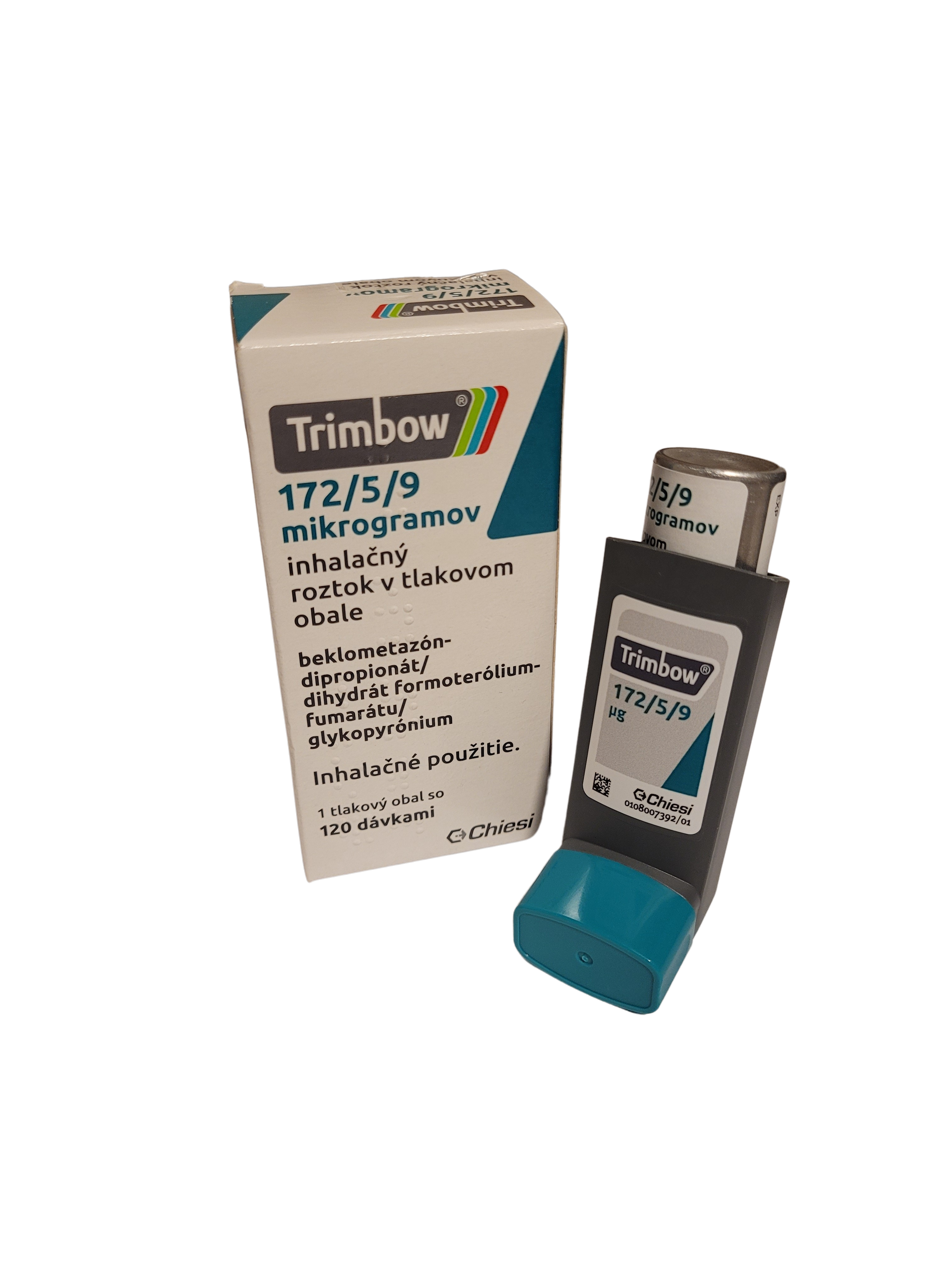
An inhaler and packaging of the 172/5/9 strength of Trimbow as marketed in Slovakia. Transparent background.

Beclometasone/formoterol/glycopyrronium, sold under the brand name Trimbow among others, is an inhalable fixed-dose combination medication for the treatment of chronic obstructive pulmonary disease and asthma. It contains beclometasone dipropionate, an inhaled corticosteroid; formoterol fumarate dihydrate, a long-acting beta2-adrenergic agonist; and glycopyrronium bromide, an anticholinergic.

Side effects include oral candidiasis (a fungal infection of the mouth caused by a yeast called Candida), muscle spasms and dry mouth.

Beclometasone/formoterol/glycopyrronium (as Trimbow) was authorized for use in the European Union in July 2017, and again in April 2018 (as Trydonis). Beclometasone/formoterol/glycopyrronium (as Trimbow) was approved for medical use in the United States in May 2026.

== Medical uses ==
In the European Union, Trimbow is indicated for the maintenance treatment in adults with moderate to severe chronic obstructive pulmonary disease (COPD) and asthma who are not adequately treated by a combination of an inhaled corticosteroid and a long-acting beta2-agonist or a combination of a long-acting beta2-agonist and a long-acting muscarinic antagonist.

In the European Union, Trydonis is indicated for the maintenance treatment in adults with moderate to severe chronic obstructive pulmonary disease (COPD) who are not adequately treated by a combination of an inhaled corticosteroid and a long-acting beta2-agonist.

In the United States, Trimbow is indicated for the maintenance treatment of asthma in people aged 18 years of age and older.

Beclometasone belongs to a group of anti-inflammatory medicines known as corticosteroids. It works in a similar way to naturally occurring corticosteroid hormones, reducing the activity of the immune system. This leads to a reduction in the release of substances that are involved in the inflammation process, such as histamine, thereby helping to keep the airways clear and allowing the patient to breathe more easily.

Formoterol is a long-acting beta-2 agonist. It attaches to receptors (targets) known as beta-2 receptors in the muscles of the airways. By attaching to these receptors, it causes the muscles to relax, which keeps the airways open and helps with the patient's breathing.

Glycopyrronium bromide is a muscarinic receptor antagonist. It opens the airways by blocking muscarinic receptors in muscle cells in the lungs. Because these receptors help control the contraction of the airway muscles, blocking them causes the muscles to relax, helping to keep the airways open and allowing the patient to breathe more easily.

== History ==
Trimbow was authorized for medical use in the European Union in July 2017, and Trydonis was authorized for medical use in the European Union in April 2018.

The combination of beclometasone, formoterol, and glycopyrronium bromide has been shown to be effective at relieving symptoms of COPD in three main studies involving over 5,500 participants whose symptoms were not controlled well enough by either combinations of two other COPD medicines or by a muscarinic receptor antagonist alone.

In the first study lasting a year, after 26 weeks of treatment the combination improved participants' FEV1 (the maximum volume of air a person can breathe out in one second) by 82 ml before a dose and 261 ml after a dose. By comparison, the FEV1 increased by 1 and 145 ml before and after dosing respectively in participants treated with a medicine containing only two of the active substances found in the combination (beclometasone plus formoterol).

In the second study lasting a year, participants treated with the combination had 20% fewer exacerbations (flare-ups of symptoms) a year than participants treated with tiotropium (a muscarinic receptor antagonist). In this study, the combination was as effective as tiotropium plus a combination of beclometasone and formoterol at reducing the number of exacerbations.

In the third study lasting a year, participants treated with the combination had 15% fewer exacerbations a year than participants treated with a combination of indacaterol (a long-acting beta-2 agonist) and glycopyrronium.
