= C13H21N5O2 =

The molecular formula C_{13}H_{21}N_{5}O_{2} (molar mass: 279.34 g/mol, exact mass: 279.1695 u) may refer to:

- Etamiphylline
- Tezampanel
