= Reproterol =

Chemical compound

Clinical data
- AHFS/Drugs.com: International Drug Names
- Routes of administration: Inhalation (MDI), IV
- ATC code: R03AC15 (WHO)

Legal status
- Legal status: DE: § 48 AMG/§ 1 MPAV (Prescription only)

Identifiers
- IUPAC name: (RS)-7-(3-{[2-(3,5-dihydroxyphenyl)-2-hydroxyethyl]amino}propyl)-1,3-dimethyl-3,7-dihydro-1H-purine-2,6-dione
- CAS Number: 54063-54-6
- PubChem CID: 25654
- ChemSpider: 23898
- UNII: 11941YC6RN
- KEGG: D08474
- ChEMBL: ChEMBL1095607
- CompTox Dashboard (EPA): DTXSID8023553
- ECHA InfoCard: 100.053.579

Chemical and physical data
- Formula: C_{18}H_{23}N_{5}O_{5}
- Molar mass: 389.412 g·mol^{−1}
- 3D model (JSmol): Interactive image
- SMILES: CN1C2=C(C(=O)N(C1=O)C)N(C=N2)CCCNCC(C3=CC(=CC(=C3)O)O)O
- InChI: InChI=1S/C18H23N5O5/c1-21-16-15(17(27)22(2)18(21)28)23(10-20-16)5-3-4-19-9-14(26)11-6-12(24)8-13(25)7-11/h6-8,10,14,19,24-26H,3-5,9H2,1-2H3; Key:WVLAAKXASPCBGT-UHFFFAOYSA-N

Reproterol is a short-acting β_{2} adrenoreceptor agonist used in the treatment of asthma.

It was patented in 1965 and came into medical use in 1977.

== Stereochemistry ==
Reproterol contains a stereocenter and is chiral. There are thus two enantiomers, the (R)-form and the (S)-form. The commercial preparations contain the drug as a racemate, an equal mixture of the two enantiomers.

Enantiomers of reproterol
(R)-Reproterol; CAS number: 210710-33-1	(S)-Reproterol; CAS number: 210710-34-2
