= Diana Temple =

Australian pharmacologist

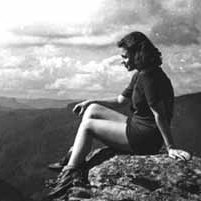
- Born: 21 April 1925; Kalgoorlie, Western Australia
- Died: 29 August 2006 (aged 81); Sydney, Australia
- Scientific career
- Fields: Respiratory Pharmacology
- Workplaces: The University of Sydney

Diana Temple AM (1925–2006) was an Australian pharmacologist and Associate Professor who pioneered respiratory research in Australia. She was recognised for her work on respiratory pharmacology, the role of women in science and in promoting popular science.

== Personal life ==
Diana Temple was born Diana Marmion on 21 April 1925 in Kalgoorlie, Western Australia, a gold-mining town on the edge of Australia's Nullarbor Plain. Temple's husband was scientist Richard Bernard Foster Temple and they had two children, Helen and Jonathan.

Temple died in Sydney in New South Wales, Australia, of chronic lung disease on 29 August 2006 at 81 years of age. Temple was a keen bush-walker who enjoyed spending time with her family. She lived her life with asthma which was worsened by bronchiectasis near the end of her life.

== Education ==
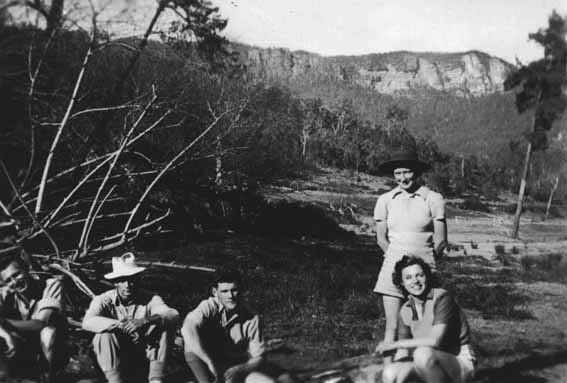
In Kings Tableland near the Jamison Valley in 1947. Photo by Temple and she is on the right of the picture

Temple graduated with a Bachelor of Science (BSc) in 1947 from the University of Western Australia in Perth, Western Australia. In 1949, she completed a Master of Science (MSc) at the University of Sydney. Temple graduated with a Doctor of Philosophy (PhD) from the University of Sydney in 1962.

== Career ==
Temple's career first began during World War II as a laboratory assistant at Western Australia's Great Boulder gold mine when she was 17 years old. Following her initial studies, Temple travelled to the United Kingdom to work at the Harwell Research Institute in Harwell, where she met and married her partner Richard. After six years, the couple returned to Sydney, where she received a grant to study further.

Temple joined the Department of Pharmacology at the University of Sydney as a Research Fellow and Part-Time Lecturer in 1961, and several years after completing her PhD, was appointed Senior Lecturer in 1967. In 1976, Temple was promoted to Associate Professor and became Head of department in 1976, a position she held until 1979.

Temple was part of a group whose research found that the representation of women in academic staff at the University of Melbourne was the same in 1975 as in 1951, due to social barriers preventing women reaching career potential.

Temple retired in 1990 and became an Honorary Fellow with the Department of Pharmacology at The University of Sydney until 2006. During her career, she published 100 scientific papers, supervised 41 research students, and delivered keynote speeches at 60 conferences. During this time, Temple was recognised as a Life Member of the Faculty of Medicine, 1995.

== Honours ==
In 1999, Diana Temple was appointed a Member (AM) of the Order of Australia for service to medical and scientific research, particularly in the field of respiratory pharmacology, as an advocate for the role of women in science and in promoting an understanding of science by the general public.

== Legacy ==
Following Temple's death, her advocacy for women in science was honoured with the annual Diana Temple AM Memorial Lecture. The 9th lecture was delivered by surgeon, Dr Caprice C. Greenberg, in May 2018. Temple's daughter Helen and grand daughter Charlotte, were in attendance, along with Professor Jennifer Byrne, a researcher who worked with Dr Temple. Professor Byrne spoke about Dr Temple's passion and advocacy for women in science, as well as her love for the environment and bush-walking.

== Leadership ==
Temple was part of a group of senior faculty who studied the role and achievements of women academics. In the book that resulted from this work, entitled Why So Few? Women Academics in Australian Universities, Temple wrote a chapter devoted to the place of women in science and medicine.

This work prompted her to go on to play a key role in the establishment of Australia's Women in Science Enquiry Network (WiSEnet) to increase women's participation in the sciences, serving as the first National Convenor. In 2016, WiSEnet merged with the national organisation Women in STEMM Australia. In the following years, Temple gave many lectures and informal talks and published several articles on women in science.

Temple was also a role model and mentor. Professor Judith Black, one of Temple's former students, said "She was a very good role model because not only was she such an active academic and researcher, but she also had a family and kids." Temple's former colleague, Professor Graham Johnston, said "She had this quiet resolve to make sure women got a fair deal—in fact to make sure that everyone got a fair deal."
