= Indacaterol/glycopyrronium bromide/mometasone =

Combination drug

Combination of
- Indacaterol: Ultra-long-acting beta-adrenoceptor agonist
- Glycopyrronium bromide: Muscarinic anticholinergic
- Mometasone furoate: Corticosteroid

Clinical data
- Trade names: Enerzair Breezhaler, Zimbus Breezhaler
- Other names: QVM149
- Pregnancy category: AU: B3
- Routes of administration: Inhalation
- ATC code: R03AL12 (WHO)

Legal status
- Legal status: AU: S4 (Prescription only); CA: ℞-only; UK: POM (Prescription only); EU: Rx-only

Identifiers
- CAS Number: 2561489-46-9
- KEGG: D11861

Indacaterol/glycopyrronium bromide/mometasone, sold under the brand name Enerzair Breezhaler among others, is an inhalable fixed-dose combination medication for the treatment of asthma. It contains indacaterol as acetate, glycopyrronium bromide, and mometasone furoate.

The most common side effects include worsening of asthma and nasopharyngitis (inflammation in the nose and throat). Other common side effects include upper respiratory tract infection (nose and throat infections) and headache.

It is the first asthma triple-combination therapy; it consists of a fixed-dose combination of three active substances (indacaterol, glycopyrronium bromide and mometasone furoate) in capsules, to be administered using an inhaler. An optional electronic sensor may also be co-packed with the product. The sensor will be attached to the base of the inhaler to collect data on the use of the inhaler by the patient. The sensor will send the data to an app on a smart phone or other suitable device. It was approved for medical use in the European Union in July 2020.

== Medical uses ==
Indacaterol/glycopyrronium bromide/mometasone is indicated as a maintenance treatment of asthma in adults not adequately controlled with a maintenance combination of a long acting beta2 agonist and a high dose of an inhaled corticosteroid who experienced one or more asthma exacerbations in the previous year.

Indacaterol is a long-acting beta-2 adrenergic receptor agonist. It relaxes the muscle around the airways into the lungs by activating targets called beta-2 receptors in the muscle cells. This helps to keep the airways open.

Glycopyrronium bromide is a muscarinic receptor antagonist. It blocks muscarinic receptors in muscle cells in the airways. Because these receptors help control the contraction of the airway muscles, blocking them causes the muscles to relax, helping to keep the airways open.

Mometasone is a corticosteroid that has anti-inflammatory effects. It works in a similar way to corticosteroid hormones in the body, reducing the activity of the immune system (the body's defences). Mometasone helps to keep the airways clear by blocking the release of substances, such as histamine, that are involved in inflammation and release of mucus in the airways.

== History ==
In April 2020, the Committee for Medicinal Products for Human Use (CHMP) of the European Medicines Agency (EMA) recommended granting a marketing authorization in the European Union for Enerzair Breezhaler, a new asthma treatment which includes an optional digital sensor. The CHMP also recommended granting a marketing authorization in the European Union for Zimbus Breezhaler which is a duplicate of Enerzair Breezhaler.

Enerzair Breezhaler and Zimbus Breezhaler were approved for medical use in the European Union in July 2020.
