= C12H18ClNO =

The molecular formula C_{12}H_{18}ClNO (molar mass: 227.73 g/mol, exact mass: 227.1077 u) may refer to:

- Tulobuterol
- Etolorex
