= Proxyphylline =

Names
- IUPAC name 7-(2-Hydroxypropyl)-1,3-dimethylpurine-2,6-dione

Identifiers
| CAS Number | 603-00-9 |
| 3D model (JSmol) | Interactive image |
| ChEMBL | ChEMBL37390 |
| ChemSpider | 4806 |
| DrugBank | DB13449 |
| ECHA InfoCard | 100.009.117 |
| EC Number | 210-028-7 |
| KEGG | D01771 |
| PubChem CID | 4977 |
| UNII | 13G1DMN4P0 |
| CompTox Dashboard (EPA) | DTXSID5023536 |
- InChI: InChI=1S/C10H14N4O3/c1-6(15)4-14-5-11-8-7(14)9(16)13(3)10(17)12(8)2/h5-6,15H,4H2,1-3H3 Key: KYHQZNGJUGFTGR-UHFFFAOYSA-N
- SMILES: CC(CN1C=NC2=C1C(=O)N(C(=O)N2C)C)O

Properties
| Chemical formula | C_{10}H_{14}N_{4}O_{3} |
| Molar mass | 238.24316 |

Pharmacology
| ATC code | R03DA03 (WHO) |
- Except where otherwise noted, data are given for materials in their standard state (at 25 °C [77 °F], 100 kPa). verify (what is ?) Infobox references

Proxyphylline is a xanthine derivative that acts as a cardiac stimulant, vasodilator and bronchodilator.
