= Carbuterol =

Chemical compound

Clinical data
- ATC code: R03CC10 (WHO)

Legal status
- Legal status: AU: S4 (Prescription only)

Identifiers
- IUPAC name: (RS)-{5-[2-(tert-butylamino)-1-hydroxyethyl]-2-hydroxyphenyl}urea
- CAS Number: 34866-47-2
- PubChem CID: 36976
- ChemSpider: 33928
- UNII: 0N12JR32MR
- ChEMBL: ChEMBL2110780
- CompTox Dashboard (EPA): DTXSID00865737
- ECHA InfoCard: 100.047.491

Chemical and physical data
- Formula: C_{13}H_{21}N_{3}O_{3}
- Molar mass: 267.329 g·mol^{−1}
- 3D model (JSmol): Interactive image
- Chirality: Racemic mixture
- SMILES: O=C(Nc1cc(ccc1O)C(O)CNC(C)(C)C)N
- InChI: InChI=1S/C13H21N3O3/c1-13(2,3)15-7-11(18)8-4-5-10(17)9(6-8)16-12(14)19/h4-6,11,15,17-18H,7H2,1-3H3,(H3,14,16,19); Key:KEMXXQOFIRIICG-UHFFFAOYSA-N

Carbuterol (INN; carbuterol hydrochloride USAN) is a short-acting β_{2} adrenoreceptor agonist.
