= Eprozinol =

Names
- Preferred IUPAC name 3-[4-(2-Methoxy-2-phenylethyl)piperazin-1-yl]-1-phenylpropan-1-ol

Identifiers
CAS Number	32665-36-4
3D model (JSmol)	Interactive image
ChEMBL	ChEMBL2107691
ChemSpider	109268
ECHA InfoCard	100.046.482
KEGG	D07379
PubChem CID	122553
UNII	IJ21AK8IVJ
CompTox Dashboard (EPA)	DTXSID10865642
- InChI: InChI=1S/C22H30N2O2/c1-26-22(20-10-6-3-7-11-20)18-24-16-14-23(15-17-24)13-12-21(25)19-8-4-2-5-9-19/h2-11,21-22,25H,12-18H2,1H3 Key: QSRHLIUOSXVKTG-UHFFFAOYSA-N
- SMILES: COC(CN1CCN(CC1)CCC(C2=CC=CC=C2)O)C3=CC=CC=C3

Properties
Chemical formula	C_{22}H_{30}N_{2}O_{2}
Molar mass	354.4858

Pharmacology
ATC code	R03DX02 (WHO)
- Except where otherwise noted, data are given for materials in their standard state (at 25 °C [77 °F], 100 kPa). verify (what is ?) Infobox references

Eprozinol is a drug for obstructive airway disease.
