= ATC code R03 =

ATC code R03 Drugs for obstructive airway diseases is a therapeutic subgroup of the Anatomical Therapeutic Chemical Classification System, a system of alphanumeric codes developed by the World Health Organization (WHO) for the classification of drugs and other medical products. Subgroup R03 is part of the anatomical group R Respiratory system.

Codes for veterinary use (ATCvet codes) can be created by placing the letter Q in front of the human ATC code: for example, QR03. ATCvet codes without corresponding human ATC codes are cited with the leading Q in the following list.
National versions of the ATC classification may include additional codes not present in this list, which follows the WHO version.

== R03A Adrenergics, inhalants ==
=== R03AA Alpha- and beta-adrenoreceptor agonists ===
R03AA01 Epinephrine

=== R03AB Non-selective beta-adrenoreceptor agonists ===
R03AB02 Isoprenaline
R03AB03 Orciprenaline

=== R03AC Selective beta-2-adrenoreceptor agonists ===
R03AC02 Salbutamol
R03AC03 Terbutaline
R03AC04 Fenoterol
R03AC05 Rimiterol
R03AC06 Hexoprenaline
R03AC07 Isoetarine
R03AC08 Pirbuterol
R03AC09 Tretoquinol
R03AC10 Carbuterol
R03AC11 Tulobuterol
R03AC12 Salmeterol
R03AC13 Formoterol
R03AC14 Clenbuterol
R03AC15 Reproterol
R03AC16 Procaterol
R03AC17 Bitolterol
R03AC18 Indacaterol
R03AC19 Olodaterol

=== R03AK Adrenergics in combination with corticosteroids or other drugs, excl. anticholinergics ===
R03AK01 Epinephrine and other drugs for obstructive airway diseases
R03AK02 Isoprenaline and other drugs for obstructive airway diseases
R03AK04 Salbutamol and sodium cromoglicate
R03AK05 Reproterol and sodium cromoglicate
R03AK06 Salmeterol and fluticasone
R03AK07 Budesonide and formoterol
R03AK08 Formoterol and beclometasone
R03AK09 Formoterol and mometasone
R03AK10 Vilanterol and fluticasone furoate
R03AK11 Formoterol and fluticasone
R03AK12 Salmeterol and budesonide
R03AK13 Salbutamol and beclometasone
R03AK14 Indacaterol and mometasone
R03AK15 Salbutamol and budesonide

=== R03AL Adrenergics in combinations with anticholinergics incl. triple combinations with corticosteroids ===
R03AL01 Fenoterol and ipratropium bromide
R03AL02 Salbutamol and ipratropium bromide
R03AL03 Vilanterol and umeclidinium bromide
R03AL04 Indacaterol and glycopyrronium bromide
R03AL05 Formoterol and aclidinium bromide
R03AL06 Olodaterol and tiotropium bromide
R03AL07 Formoterol and glycopyrronium bromide
R03AL08 Vilanterol, umeclidinium bromide, and fluticasone furoate
R03AL09 Formoterol, glycopyrronium bromide and beclometasone
R03AL10 Formoterol and tiotropium bromide
R03AL11 Formoterol, glycopyrronium bromide, and budesonide
R03AL12 Indacaterol, glycopyrronium bromide and mometasone

== R03B Other drugs for obstructive airway diseases, inhalants ==
=== R03BA Glucocorticoids ===
R03BA01 Beclometasone
R03BA02 Budesonide
R03BA03 Flunisolide
R03BA04 Betamethasone
R03BA05 Fluticasone
R03BA06 Triamcinolone
R03BA07 Mometasone
R03BA08 Ciclesonide
R03BA09 Fluticasone furoate

=== R03BB Anticholinergics ===
R03BB01 Ipratropium bromide
R03BB02 Oxitropium bromide
R03BB03 Stramoni preparations
R03BB04 Tiotropium bromide
R03BB05 Aclidinium bromide
R03BB06 Glycopyrronium bromide
R03BB07 Umeclidinium bromide
R03BB08 Revefenacin
R03BB54 Tiotropium bromide, combinations

=== R03BC Antiallergic agents, excluding corticosteroids ===
R03BC01 Cromoglicic acid
R03BC03 Nedocromil

=== R03BX Other drugs for obstructive airway diseases, inhalants ===
R03BX01 Fenspiride
R03BX02 Ensifentrine

== R03C Adrenergics for systemic use ==
=== R03CA Alpha- and beta-adrenoreceptor agonists ===
R03CA02 Ephedrine

=== R03CB Non-selective beta-adrenoreceptor agonists ===
R03CB01 Isoprenaline
R03CB02 Methoxyphenamine
R03CB03 Orciprenaline
R03CB51 Isoprenaline, combinations
R03CB53 Orciprenaline, combinations

=== R03CC Selective beta-2-adrenoreceptor agonists ===
R03CC02 Salbutamol
R03CC03 Terbutaline
R03CC04 Fenoterol
R03CC05 Hexoprenaline
R03CC06 Isoetarine
R03CC07 Pirbuterol
R03CC08 Procaterol
R03CC09 Tretoquinol
R03CC10 Carbuterol
R03CC11 Tulobuterol
R03CC12 Bambuterol
R03CC13 Clenbuterol
R03CC14 Reproterol
R03CC15 Formoterol
R03CC53 Terbutaline, combinations
R03CC63 Clenbuterol and ambroxol
QR03CC90 Clenbuterol, combinations

== R03D Other systemic drugs for obstructive airway diseases ==
=== R03DA Xanthines ===
R03DA01 Diprophylline
R03DA02 Choline theophyllinate
R03DA03 Proxyphylline
R03DA04 Theophylline
R03DA05 Aminophylline
R03DA06 Etamiphylline
R03DA07 Theobromine
R03DA08 Bamifylline
R03DA09 Acefylline piperazine
R03DA10 Bufylline
R03DA11 Doxofylline
R03DA12 Mepyramine theophyllinacetate
R03DA20 Combinations of xanthines
R03DA51 Diprophylline, combinations
R03DA54 Theophylline, combinations excluding psycholeptics
R03DA55 Aminophylline, combinations
R03DA57 Theobromine, combinations
R03DA74 Theophylline, combinations with psycholeptics

=== R03DB Xanthines and adrenergics ===
R03DB01 Diprophylline and adrenergics
R03DB02 Choline theophyllinate and adrenergics
R03DB03 Proxyphylline and adrenergics
R03DB04 Theophylline and adrenergics
R03DB05 Aminophylline and adrenergics
R03DB06 Etamiphylline and adrenergics

=== R03DC Leukotriene receptor antagonists ===
R03DC01 Zafirlukast
R03DC02 Pranlukast
R03DC03 Montelukast
R03DC04 Ibudilast
R03DC53 Montelukast, combinations

=== R03DX Other systemic drugs for obstructive airway diseases ===
R03DX01 Amlexanox
R03DX02 Eprozinol
R03DX03 Fenspiride
R03DX05 Omalizumab
R03DX06 Seratrodast
R03DX07 Roflumilast
R03DX08 Reslizumab
R03DX09 Mepolizumab
R03DX10 Benralizumab
R03DX11 Tezepelumab
R03DX12 Depemokimab
