= Doxofylline =

Chemical compound

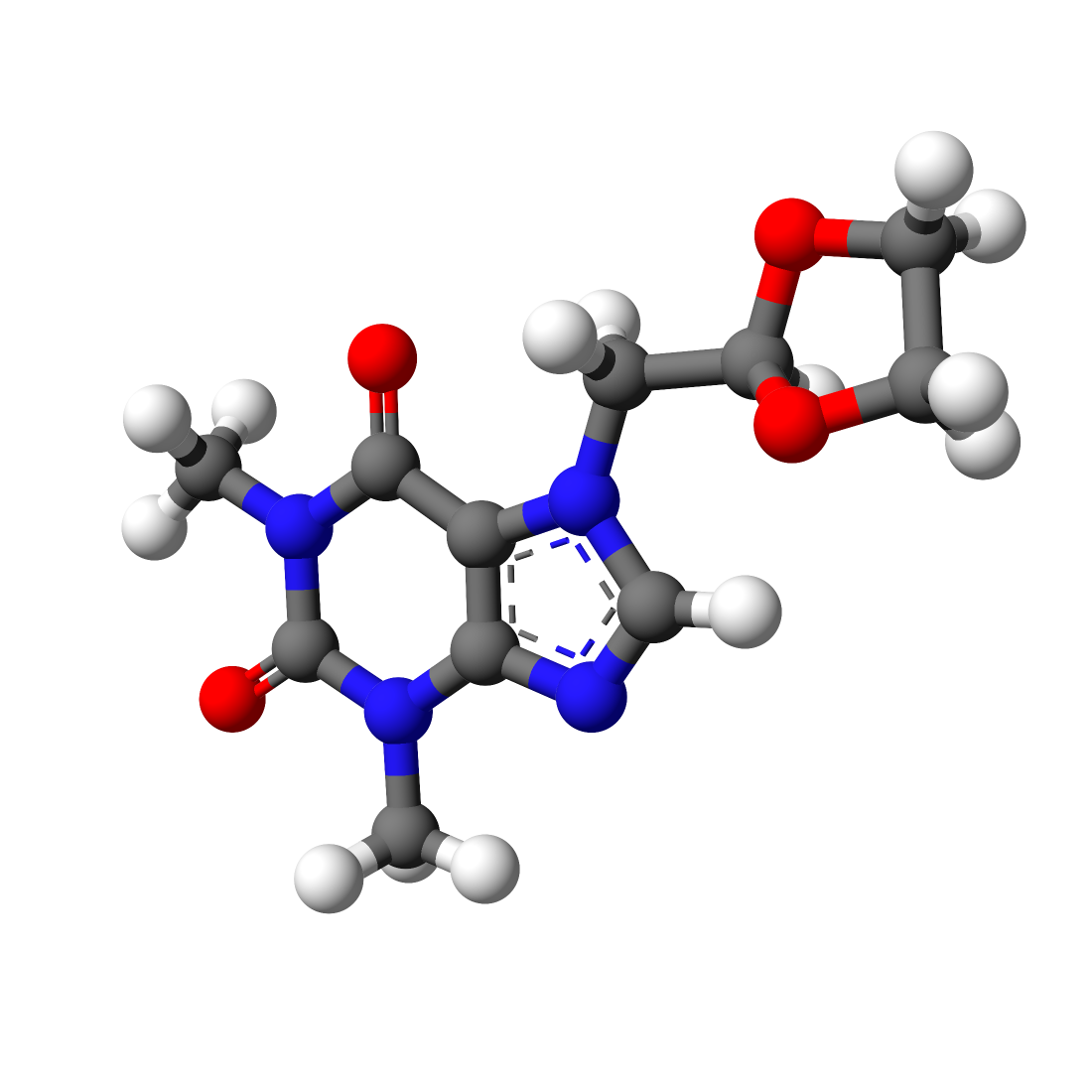

Clinical data
- AHFS/Drugs.com: International Drug Names
- Routes of administration: By mouth
- ATC code: R03DA11 (WHO)

Legal status
- Legal status: In general: ℞ (Prescription only)

Identifiers
- IUPAC name: 7-(1,3-Dioxolan-2-ylmethyl)-1,3-dimethylpurine-2,6-dione
- CAS Number: 69975-86-6
- PubChem CID: 50942
- DrugBank: DB09273
- ChemSpider: 46175
- UNII: MPM23GMO7Z
- KEGG: D03898
- CompTox Dashboard (EPA): DTXSID7022968
- ECHA InfoCard: 100.067.468

Chemical and physical data
- Formula: C_{11}H_{14}N_{4}O_{4}
- Molar mass: 266.257 g·mol^{−1}
- 3D model (JSmol): Interactive image
- SMILES: CN1C2=C(C(=O)N(C1=O)C)N(C=N2)CC3OCCO3
- InChI: InChI=1S/C11H14N4O4/c1-13-9-8(10(16)14(2)11(13)17)15(6-12-9)5-7-18-3-4-19-7/h6-7H,3-5H2,1-2H3; Key:HWXIGFIVGWUZAO-UHFFFAOYSA-N

Doxofylline (also known as doxophylline) is a phosphodiesterase inhibiting bronchodilator used in the treatment of chronic respiratory diseases such as asthma and COPD. Like theophylline, it is a xanthine derivative.

== Medical uses ==
Doxophylline is used to treat chronic respiratory diseases such as asthma and COPD. in clinical studies, it appears to be equal in efficacy to theophylline but with significantly fewer side effects. In 2014, the US Food and Drug Administration (FDA) granted an orphan drug designation to doxofylline for the treatment of bronchiectasis following the submission of an application by Alitair Pharmaceuticals.

== Pharmacology ==
Unlike other xanthines, doxofylline lacks any significant affinity for adenosine receptors and does not produce stimulant effects. This suggests that its antiasthmatic effects are mediated by another mechanism, perhaps its actions on phosphodiesterase. From a pharmacokinetic point of view, doxofylline importantly differs from theophylline also because it lacks the ability to interfere with the cytochrome enzymes CYP1A2, CYP2E1 and CYP3A4, thus preventing significant interaction with other drugs metabolized via these pathways in the liver.

Concomitant treatment with certain other medications (including allopurinol, H2 receptor antagonists, lincosamide antibiotics, macrolide antibiotics, and propranolol) can decrease the hepatic clearance of doxofylline, which can result in increased serum levels of doxofylline.

== Names ==
It is marketed under many brand names worldwide, including: Xiva, An Li Nuo Er, An Sai Ma, Ansimar, Asima, Bestofyline, Chuan Ning, D-Fyal, Dilatair, Doxiba, Doxiva, Doxobid, Doxobron, Doxofilina, Doxofillina, Doxofyllin, Doxoll, Doxophylline, Doxovent, Doxyjohn, Fei Te Ai Si, Fixolin, Jian Fang Neng, Lang Ming, Lv Meng, Mai Ping Xi, Maxivent, Mucosma, Na De Lai, Phylex, Phyllin, Puroxan, Rexipin, Shu Zhi, Shuai An, Shuweixin, Suo Di, Suo Ji, Suo Li An, Xi Si Nuo, Xin Qian Ping, Xin Xi Ping, Yi Suo, and Yili.

It is also marketed as a combination drug with terbutaline as Doxoll-TL, Mucosma-T and Phylex-TR. It is also marketed as a combination drug with montelukast as Doxoll-ML, Doxomont, Doxoril-M, Doxovent-M, Lunair-M, and Venidox-M.
