= Indacaterol/mometasone =

Combination drug

Combination of
- Indacaterol: Beta-2 adrenergic receptor agonist
- Mometasone: Corticosteroid

Clinical data
- Trade names: Atectura Breezhaler, Bemrist Breezhaler
- Other names: QMF149, IND/MF
- Routes of administration: Inhalation
- ATC code: R03AK14 (WHO)

Legal status
- Legal status: CA: ℞-only; EU: Rx-only; In general: ℞ (Prescription only)

Identifiers
- KEGG: D11862

Indacaterol/mometasone, sold under the brand name Atectura Breezhaler among others, is a fixed-dose combination medication for the treatment of asthma in adults and adolescents twelve years of age and older not adequately controlled with inhaled corticosteroids and inhaled short acting beta_{2} agonists.

The most common side effects include worsening of asthma and nasopharyngitis (inflammation in the nose and throat). Other common side effects include upper respiratory tract infection (nose and throat infections) and headache. Indacaterol/mometasone was approved for medical use in the European Union in May 2020, and in Japan in June 2020.
