= Tretoquinol =

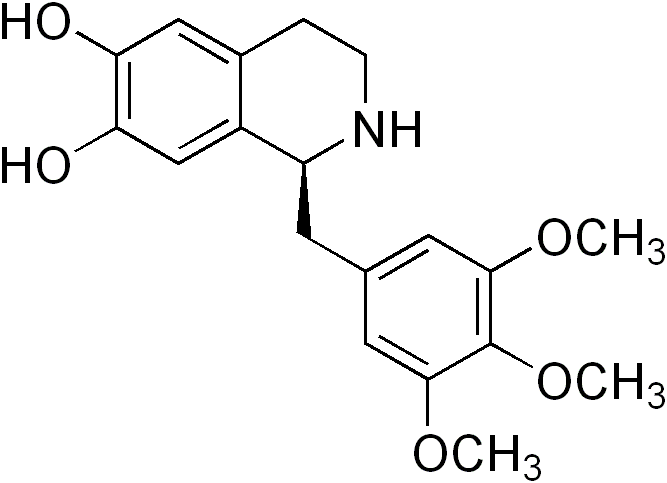

Names
- Preferred IUPAC name (1S)-1-[(3,4,5-Trimethoxyphenyl)methyl]-1,2,3,4-tetrahydroisoquinoline-6,7-diol

Identifiers
| CAS Number | 30418-38-3 |
| 3D model (JSmol) | Interactive image |
| ChEMBL | ChEMBL174984 |
| ChemSpider | 59192 |
| MeSH | Tretoquinol |
| PubChem CID | 65772 |
| UNII | JIO3275WGI |
| CompTox Dashboard (EPA) | DTXSID7023695 |
- InChI: InChI=1S/C19H23NO5/c1-23-17-7-11(8-18(24-2)19(17)25-3)6-14-13-10-16(22)15(21)9-12(13)4-5-20-14/h7-10,14,20-22H,4-6H2,1-3H3/t14-/m0/s1 Key: RGVPOXRFEPSFGH-AWEZNQCLSA-N; InChI=1/C19H23NO5/c1-23-17-7-11(8-18(24-2)19(17)25-3)6-14-13-10-16(22)15(21)9-12(13)4-5-20-14/h7-10,14,20-22H,4-6H2,1-3H3/t14-/m0/s1 Key: RGVPOXRFEPSFGH-AWEZNQCLBM
- SMILES: O(c1cc(cc(OC)c1OC)C[C@H]3c2c(cc(O)c(O)c2)CCN3)C

Properties
| Chemical formula | C_{19}H_{23}NO_{5} |
| Molar mass | 345.39 g/mol |

Pharmacology
| ATC code | R03AC09 (WHO) |
- Except where otherwise noted, data are given for materials in their standard state (at 25 °C [77 °F], 100 kPa). verify (what is ?) Infobox references

Tretoquinol is a beta-adrenergic agonist.
