= Women in Science Enquiry Network =

Historical networking and advocacy group for women's participation in science in Australia

WISENET
- Women in Science Enquiry NETwork
- Successor: Women in STEMM Australia
- Formation: 1984
- Merger of: Women in Science AUSTRALIA

WiSENet (Women in Science Enquiry NETwork), was a volunteer network for women scientists in Australia established in 1984. It was created from the Women's Studies forum at the 1984 conference of the Australian & New Zealand Association for the Advancement of Science (ANZAAS) in Canberra. The network was formed with the goal of giving women a fairer share in the responsibilities and benefits of science and technological change. Member concerns included discrimination in academic and scientific employment. One of the key people in establishing the Network was chemist Diana Temple. Temple was part of a group whose research found that the representation of women in academic staff at the University of Melbourne was the same in 1975 as in 1951, due to social barriers preventing women reaching career potential.

WiSENet operated through autonomous state branches and regional groups (such as Wollongong and Lismore), organising local activities and linking with other groups for overarching issues. Separate topic-based interest groups were established, such as that responsible for the historical exhibition on Australian women in science. Membership was open to all genders involved or interested in the sciences, in working towards the network's objectives. In 2003, a Tasmanian link group (branch) was created by glaciologist, Dr Barbara Smith.

At the end of 2015, WiSENet merged with Women in Science AUSTRALIA, under the shared name, Women in Science AUSTRALIA, now known as Women in STEMM Australia.

== Objectives ==
The network aimed to combat sex segregation and underrepresentation by increasing women's participation at all levels of science. Broader employment and education structures were assessed as to how they restricted women's opportunities, and programs for change were promoted for more democratic and participatory systems. Data was gathered about women in the sciences. The network linked different science disciplines and promoted communication between scientists and the community about social and environmental issues.

=== Activities ===
From their inception, the network included an education group which hosted talks in Canberra. WiSENet established a science shop, which was launched in February 1988 by Dr Norman Swan within the grounds of the Australian National University. The science shop linked scientific expertise with community groups, with projects on recycling polystyrene and collating information on repetitive strain injury. The science shop activities were wound up due to lack of resources in May 1990.

In 1985, WiSENet was one of several women in science groups to meet at the 1985 ANZAAS Congress, held at the Monash University. This was one year after the network was created from the previous Congress. WiSENet met with the McClintock Collective, Melbourne; Women in Chemistry Network, Melbourne (WINC); and Women in Engineering, Melbourne. As well as the sessions on 'Gender bias in research', and 'The missing half – women in science', the groups began planning for the 1986 national conference.

In 1989, WiSENet ran a program of speakers about careers for women in science and technology. It toured in Sydney, Wollongong, Newcastle and Canberra (possibly South Australia).

In 1992, activities included:

- lobbying regarding budget cuts and advocating for increased funding to medical research as an area of employment for women,
- joining two coalitions of women's groups sponsored by the National Foundation for Australian Women. These were Women into Politics and CAPOW (Coalition of Australian Participating Organisations of Women), and
- updating the display about women in science and technology and Australia, shown at the Australian Festival of Science.

In 1997, WiSENet received a project grant to interest secondary school students in science and technology careers. This included publication of the Science Futures magazine, distributed to schools during Science Week in 1998. The magazine featured career profiles of young people in the science and technology space.

=== Journal ===
The first issue of the WiSENet journal was published in April 1984, with the fiftieth anniversary issue in February 1999. The December 2010 issue stated an anticipated end to the printed edition of the journal ahead of redevelopment of the network's website.

In 2025, the WiSENet journals (1984–2000), were digitised with funding from the Friends of the Library and added to Trove. Dr Rebecca Fleming noted that the individual profiles of women scientists within the journals provide an archive of their contributions despite the barriers in the field.
