= Pirbuterol =

Chemical compound

Clinical data
- Trade names: Maxair
- AHFS/Drugs.com: Consumer Drug Information
- MedlinePlus: a601096
- Pregnancy category: C
- Routes of administration: Inhalational (MDI)
- ATC code: R03AC08 (WHO) R03CC07 (WHO)

Legal status
- Legal status: AU: S4 (Prescription only); US: ℞-only

Identifiers
- IUPAC name: (RS)-6-[2-(tert-butylamino)-1-hydroxyethyl]-2-(hydroxymethyl)pyridin-3-ol
- CAS Number: 38677-81-5; HCl: 38029-10-6
- PubChem CID: 4845
- IUPHAR/BPS: 7272
- DrugBank: DB01291
- ChemSpider: 4679
- UNII: OG645J8RVW; HCl: J6793T658K
- KEGG: D08387
- ChEMBL: ChEMBL1094966
- CompTox Dashboard (EPA): DTXSID0046937

Chemical and physical data
- Formula: C_{12}H_{20}N_{2}O_{3}
- Molar mass: 240.303 g·mol^{−1}
- 3D model (JSmol): Interactive image
- Chirality: Racemic mixture
- SMILES: Oc1ccc(nc1CO)C(O)CNC(C)(C)C
- InChI: InChI=1S/C12H20N2O3/c1-12(2,3)13-6-11(17)8-4-5-10(16)9(7-15)14-8/h4-5,11,13,15-17H,6-7H2,1-3H3; Key:VQDBNKDJNJQRDG-UHFFFAOYSA-N

Pirbuterol (trade name Maxair) is a short-acting β_{2} adrenoreceptor agonist with bronchodilating action used in the treatment of asthma, available (as pirbuterol acetate) as a breath-activated metered-dose inhaler.

It was patented in 1971 and came into medical use in 1983.

== Medical use ==
Pirbuterol is used in asthma for reversal of acute bronchospasm, and also as a maintenance medication to prevent future attacks. It should be used in patients 12 years of age and older with or without concurrent theophylline and/or inhaled corticosteroid.

== Pharmacokinetics ==
After inhalation of doses up to 800 μg (twice the maximum recommended dose) systemic blood levels of pirbuterol are below the limit of assay sensitivity (2–5 ng/ml). A mean of 51% of the dose is recovered in urine as pirbuterol plus its sulfate conjugate following administration by aerosol. Pirbuterol is not metabolized by catechol-O-methyltransferase. The plasma half-life measured after oral administration is about two hours.
