= Fenspiride =

Chemical compound

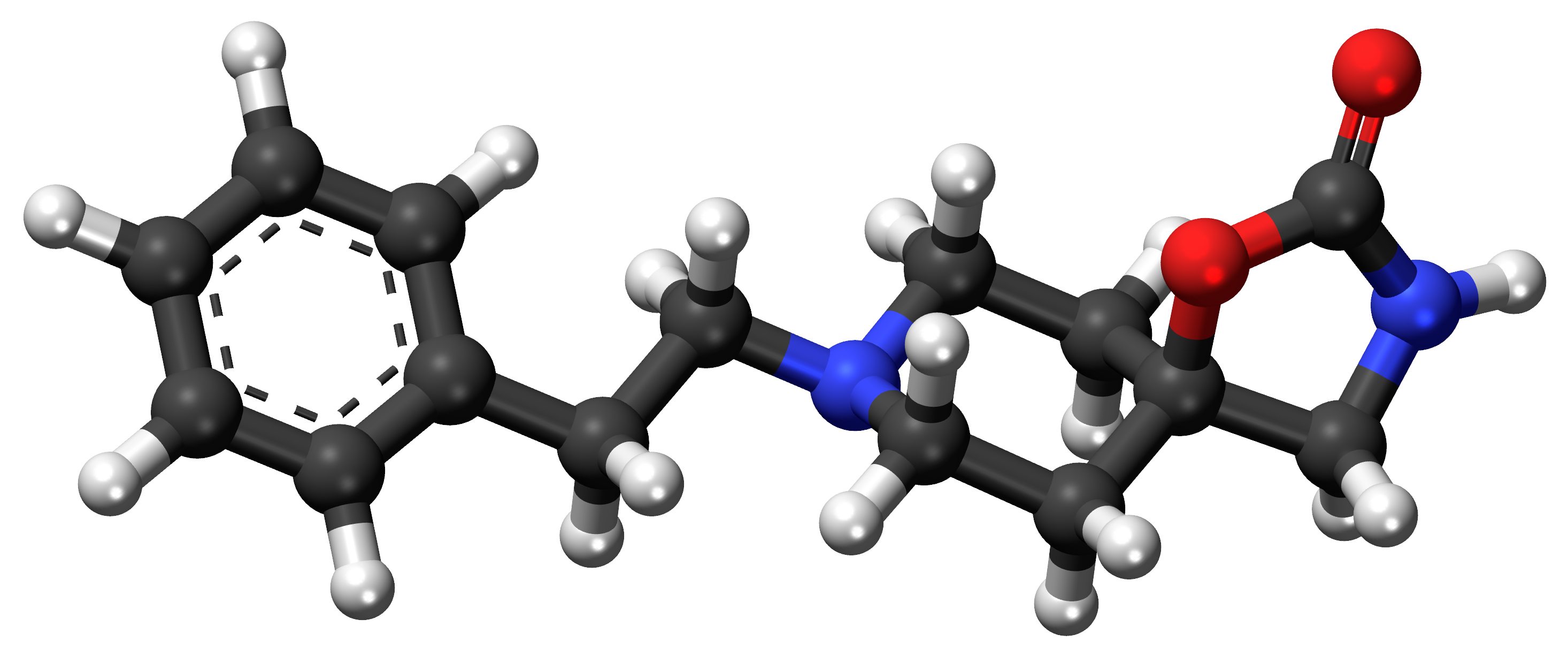

Clinical data
- Trade names: Eurespal, Pneumorel
- AHFS/Drugs.com: International Drug Names
- Routes of administration: Oral
- ATC code: R03BX01 (WHO) R03DX03 (WHO)

Legal status
- Legal status: In general: ℞ (Prescription only)

Pharmacokinetic data
- Bioavailability: 90%
- Elimination half-life: 14–16 hours
- Excretion: Urine (90%), feces (~10%)

Identifiers
- IUPAC name: 8-(2-phenylethyl)-1-oxa-3,8-diazaspiro[4.5]decan-2-one
- CAS Number: 5053-06-5
- PubChem CID: 68626
- DrugBank: DB08979
- ChemSpider: 3227
- UNII: S983QC7HKM
- KEGG: D07949
- ChEMBL: ChEMBL576127
- CompTox Dashboard (EPA): DTXSID4023048
- ECHA InfoCard: 100.023.411

Chemical and physical data
- Formula: C_{15}H_{20}N_{2}O_{2}
- Molar mass: 260.337 g·mol^{−1}
- 3D model (JSmol): Interactive image
- SMILES: c1ccc(cc1)CCN2CCC3(CC2)CN=C(O3)O
- InChI: InChI=1S/C15H20N2O2/c18-14-16-12-15(19-14)7-10-17(11-8-15)9-6-13-4-2-1-3-5-13/h1-5H,6-12H2,(H,16,18); Key:FVNFBBAOMBJTST-UHFFFAOYSA-N

Fenspiride (INN, brand names Eurespal, Pneumorel and others) is an oxazolidinone spiro compound used as a drug in the treatment of certain respiratory diseases. The pharmacotherapeutic classification is antitussives. In Russia it was approved for the treatment of acute and chronic inflammatory diseases of ENT organs (ear, nose, throat) and the respiratory tract (like rhinopharyngitis, laryngitis, tracheobronchitis, otitis and sinusitis), as well as for maintenance treatment of asthma. Russia, Romania, France and other European countries withdrew fenspiride-based drugs from the market due to the risk of QT prolongation and torsades de pointes. Fenspiride is known to have activity as an alpha-1 blocker, H1 antagonist, it also inhibits PDE3, PDE4, PDE5 with -logIC50 values of 3.44, 4.16, 3.8 respectively.
