= Glycopyrronium bromide/formoterol =

Combination medication

Combination of
- Glycopyrronium bromide: Muscarinic anticholinergic
- Formoterol: Long-acting β_{2} agonist (LABA)

Clinical data
- Trade names: Bevespi Aerosphere
- AHFS/Drugs.com: Monograph
- License data: US DailyMed: Glycopyrrolate and formoterol
- Routes of administration: By mouth (inhalation)
- ATC code: R03AL07 (WHO)

Legal status
- Legal status: CA: ℞-only; US: ℞-only; EU: Rx-only; In general: ℞ (Prescription only)

Identifiers
- KEGG: D11036

Glycopyrronium bromide/formoterol, sold under the brand name Bevespi Aerosphere, is a combination medication used for the maintenance treatment of chronic obstructive pulmonary disease (COPD). It is a combination of glycopyrronium bromide and formoterol. It is inhaled.

The most common side effects include headache, nausea (feeling sick), muscle spasms and dizziness.

Glycopyrronium bromide is a muscarinic receptor antagonist. This means that it blocks muscarinic receptors (targets) in muscle cells in the lungs. Because these receptors help control the contraction of muscles, when glycopyrronium is inhaled, it causes the muscles of the airways to relax, helping to keep the airways open.

Formoterol is a long-acting beta-2 agonist. It works by attaching to receptors known as beta-2 receptors found in the muscles of the airways. When it attaches to these receptors, it causes the muscles to relax, which keeps the airways open.

== Medical uses ==
Glycopyrronium bromide/formoterol is indicated as a maintenance bronchodilator treatment to relieve symptoms in adults with chronic obstructive pulmonary disease (COPD).

== History ==
Glycopyrronium bromide/formoterol was approved for medical use in the United States in April 2016, and in the European Union in December 2018.

It is marketed by AstraZeneca.
