= Forodesine =

Chemical compound

Clinical data
- Trade names: Mundesine and Fodosine
- Routes of administration: oral

Identifiers
- IUPAC name: 7-[(2S,3S,4R,5R)-3,4-Dihydroxy-5-(hydroxymethyl)-2-pyrrolidinyl]-1,5-dihydropyrrolo[2,3-e]pyrimidin-4-one
- CAS Number: 209799-67-7
- PubChem CID: 444499
- ChemSpider: 392417
- UNII: 426X066ELK
- KEGG: D06596
- ChEMBL: ChEMBL218291
- CompTox Dashboard (EPA): DTXSID50943276

Chemical and physical data
- Formula: C_{11}H_{14}N_{4}O_{4}
- Molar mass: 266.257 g·mol^{−1}
- 3D model (JSmol): Interactive image
- SMILES: C1=C(C2=C(N1)C(=O)NC=N2)[C@H]3[C@@H]([C@@H]([C@H](N3)CO)O)O
- InChI: InChI=1S/C11H14N4O4/c16-2-5-9(17)10(18)7(15-5)4-1-12-8-6(4)13-3-14-11(8)19/h1,3,5,7,9-10,12,15-18H,2H2,(H,13,14,19)/t5-,7+,9-,10+/m1/s1; Key:IWKXDMQDITUYRK-KUBHLMPHBW; InChI=1/C11H14N4O4/c16-2-5-9(17)10(18)7(15-5)4-1-12-8-6(4)13-3-14-11(8)19/h1,3,5,7,9-10,12,15-18H,2H2,(H,13,14,19)/t5-,7+,9-,10+/m1/s1

Forodesine (INN; also known as Immucillin H; trade names Mundesine and Fodosine) is a transition-state analog inhibitor of purine nucleoside phosphorylase studied for the treatment of patients with T-cell acute lymphoblastic leukemia (T-ALL) and for treatment of B-cell acute lymphocytic leukemia (B-ALL).

Forodesine was originally discovered by Vern Schramm's laboratory at the Albert Einstein College of Medicine in New York and Industrial Research Limited in New Zealand.

Forodesine is being developed by BioCryst Pharmaceuticals. As of 2008, it is currently in phase II clinical trials..

In 2006, BioCryst entered into a licensing agreement with Mundipharma International Holdings Limited to develop and commercialize forodesine in markets across Europe, Asia, and Australasia for use in oncology.

In April 2017, forodesine was approved in Japan for the treatment of relapsed/refractory peripheral T-cell lymphoma.

== See also ==
- Acute lymphoblastic leukemia
