= Etamiphylline =

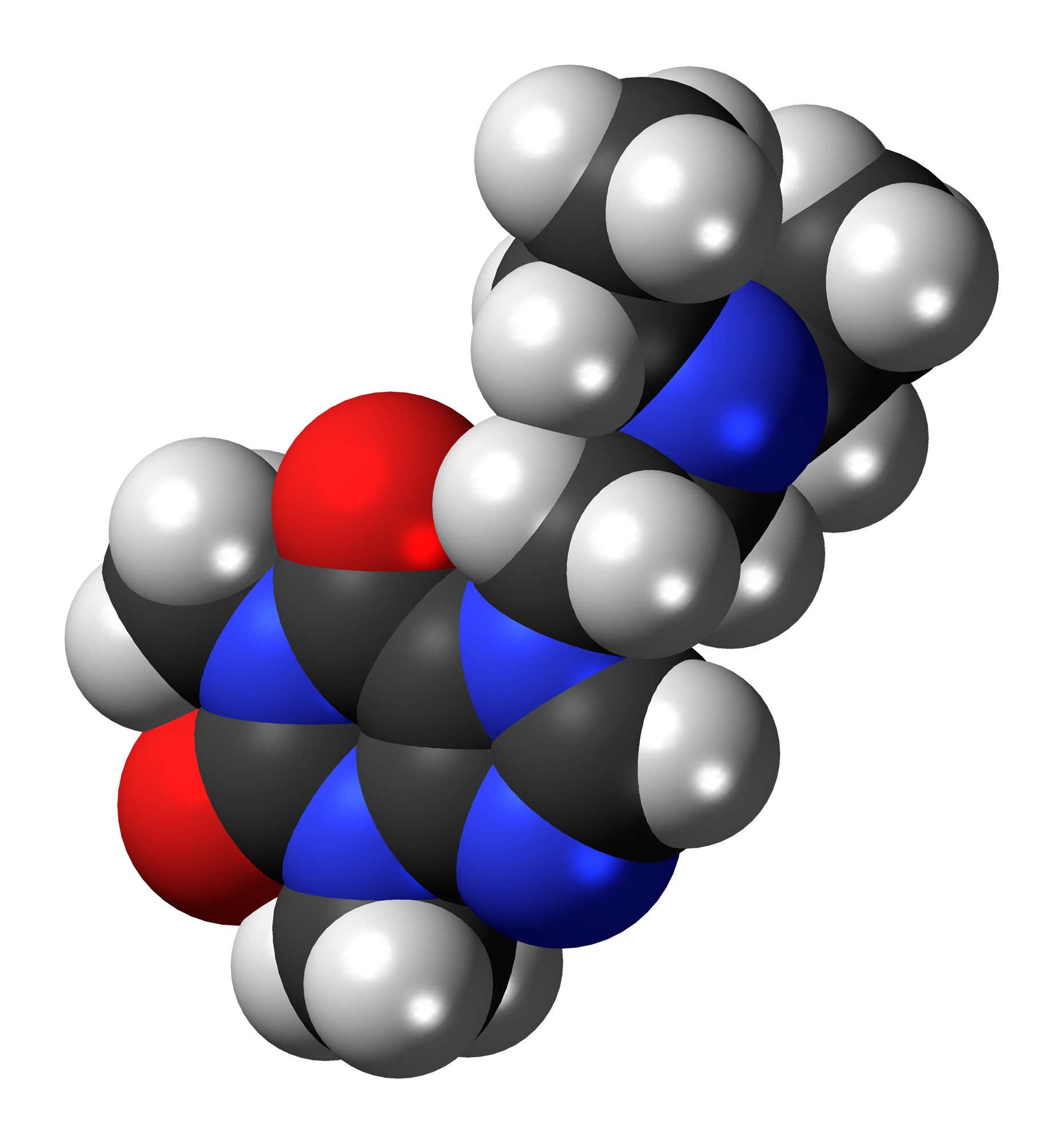

Names
- Preferred IUPAC name 7-[2-(Diethylamino)ethyl]-1,3-dimethyl-3,7-dihydro-1H-purine-2,6-dione

Identifiers
CAS Number	314-35-2
3D model (JSmol)	Interactive image
ChemSpider	26354
ECHA InfoCard	100.005.678
KEGG	D07378
PubChem CID	28329
UNII	221A91BQ2S
CompTox Dashboard (EPA)	DTXSID10861866
- InChI: InChI=1S/C13H21N5O2/c1-5-17(6-2)7-8-18-9-14-11-10(18)12(19)16(4)13(20)15(11)3/h9H,5-8H2,1-4H3 Key: AWKLBIOQCIORSB-UHFFFAOYSA-N
- SMILES: CCN(CC)CCn1cnc2c1c(=O)n(c(=O)n2C)C

Properties
Chemical formula	C_{13}H_{21}N_{5}O_{2}
Molar mass	279.33814

Pharmacology
ATC code	R03DA06 (WHO)
- Except where otherwise noted, data are given for materials in their standard state (at 25 °C [77 °F], 100 kPa). verify (what is ?) Infobox references

Etamiphylline or etamiphyllin (INN) is a xanthine intended for use as an anti-asthma agent. It has shown poor to absent effects in human clinical trials.
