= Tulobuterol =

Chemical compound

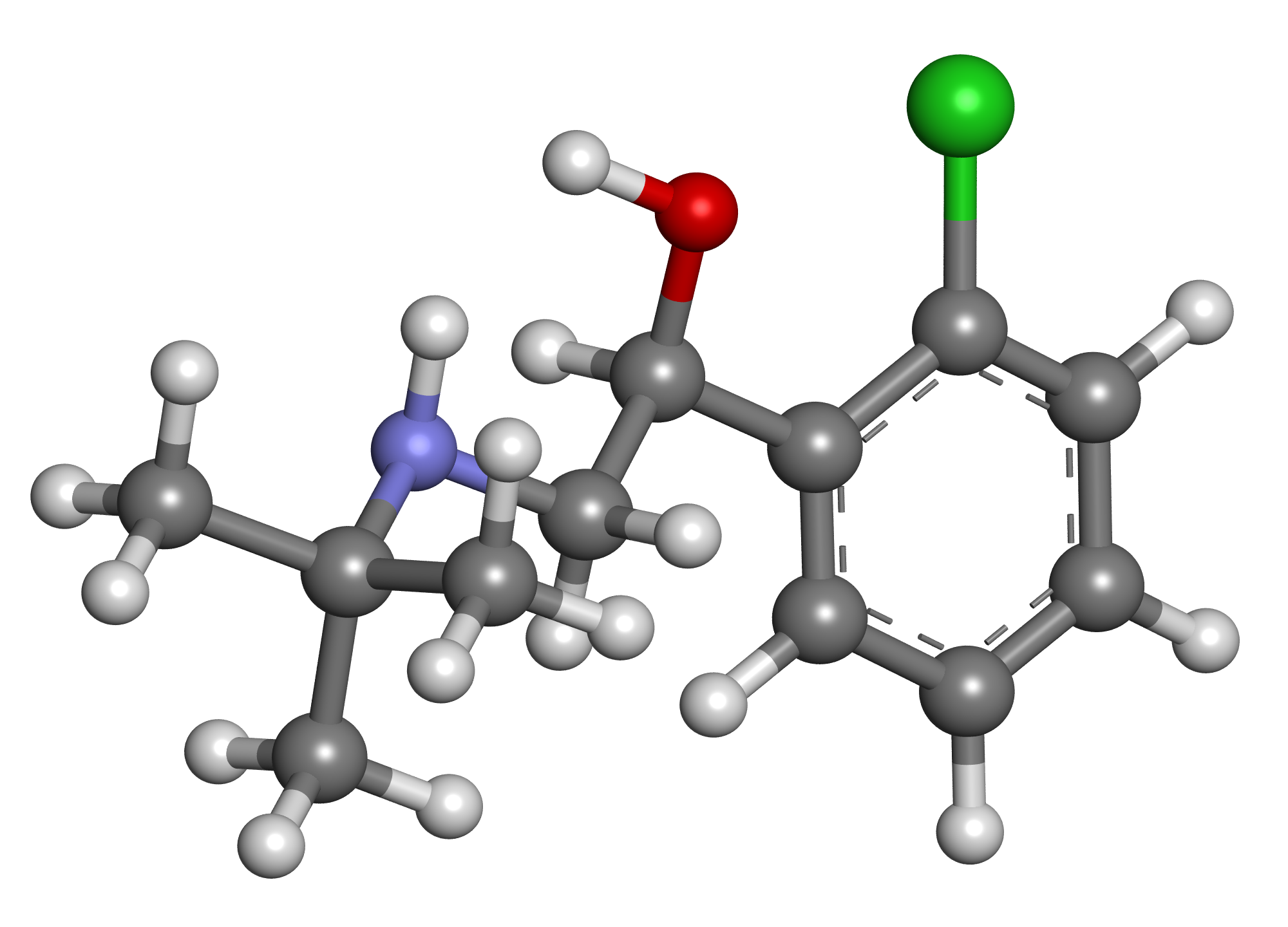

Clinical data
- AHFS/Drugs.com: International Drug Names
- Routes of administration: Inhaled, oral, transdermal patch
- ATC code: R03AC11 (WHO)

Legal status
- Legal status: AU: S4 (Prescription only); In general: ℞ (Prescription only)

Identifiers
- IUPAC name: (RS)-2-(tert-butylamino)-1-(2-chlorophenyl)ethanol
- CAS Number: 41570-61-0
- PubChem CID: 5606
- ChemSpider: 5404
- UNII: 591I9SU0F7
- KEGG: D02151
- ChEMBL: ChEMBL1159717
- CompTox Dashboard (EPA): DTXSID7048457
- ECHA InfoCard: 100.168.691

Chemical and physical data
- Formula: C_{12}H_{18}ClNO
- Molar mass: 227.73 g·mol^{−1}
- 3D model (JSmol): Interactive image
- SMILES: Clc1ccccc1C(O)CNC(C)(C)C
- InChI: InChI=1S/C12H18ClNO/c1-12(2,3)14-8-11(15)9-6-4-5-7-10(9)13/h4-7,11,14-15H,8H2,1-3H3; Key:YREYLAVBNPACJM-UHFFFAOYSA-N

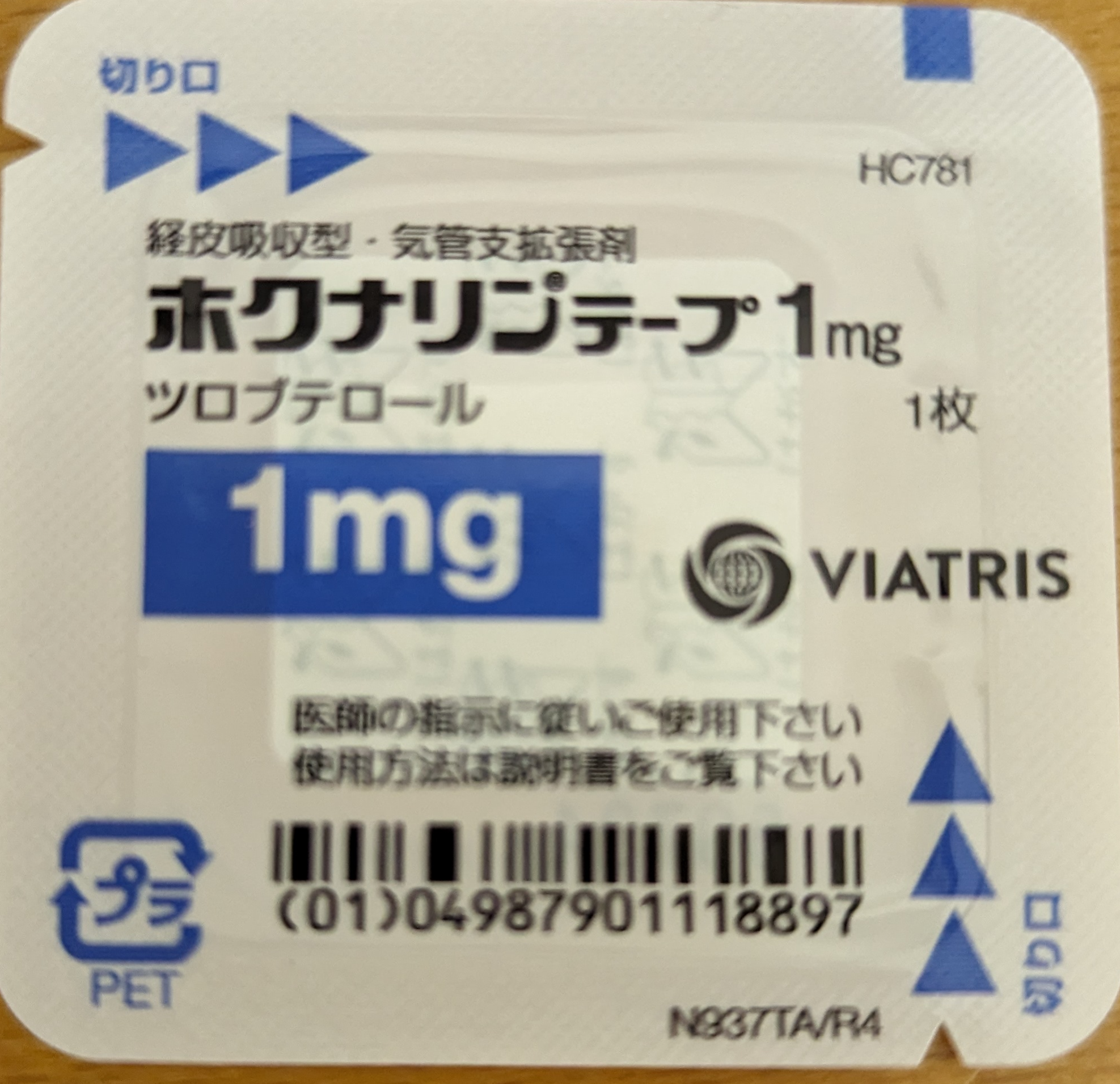
"Hokunarin Tape" used to treat asthma and bronchitis

Tulobuterol (INN) is a long-acting beta2-adrenergic receptor agonist, marketed in Japan as a transdermal patch under the name Hokunalin tape (ホクナリンテープ).

Currently, it is only legal in 7 countries: Japan, Germany, China, South Korea, Bangladesh, Pakistan, and Venezuela. It is available in India also.

== Synthesis ==

The oxidation of 2'-chloroacetophenone (1) with selenium dioxide gives o-chlorophenylglyoxal (2). Condensation with tert-butylamine gives the imine (3). Reduction with sodium borohydride completes the synthesis of tulobuterol.
