= Metered-dose inhaler =

Device that delivers medication to the lungs

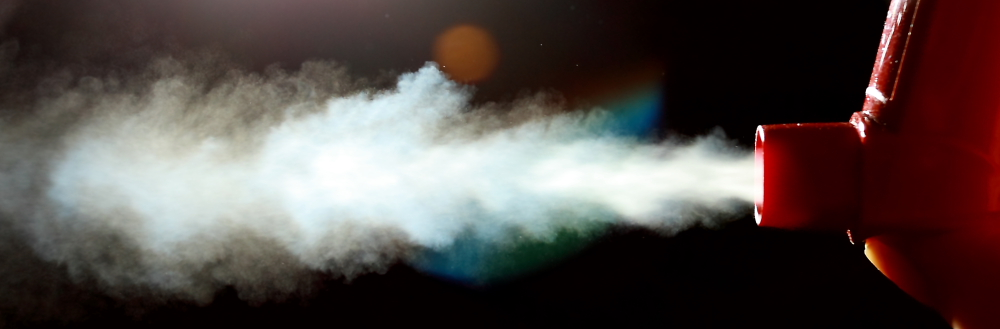
Metered-dose inhaler

A metered-dose inhaler (MDI) is a device that delivers a specific amount of medication to the lungs in the form of a short burst of aerosolized medicine that is usually self-administered by the patient via inhalation. It is the most commonly used delivery system for treating asthma, chronic obstructive pulmonary disease (COPD) and other respiratory diseases. The medication in a metered dose inhaler is most commonly a bronchodilator, corticosteroid or a combination of both for treating asthma and COPD. Other medications less commonly used but also administered by MDI are mast cell stabilizers, such as cromoglicate or nedocromil.

== Description ==
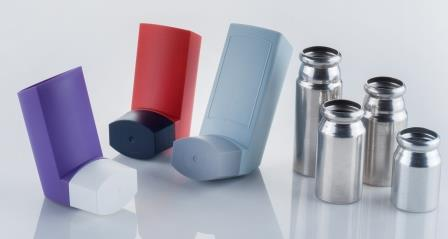
MDI canister and actuator components

A metered-dose inhaler consists of three major components: the canister, which is produced in aluminum or stainless steel by means of deep drawing, where the formulation resides; the metering valve, which allows a metered quantity of the formulation to be dispensed with each actuation; and an actuator (or mouthpiece) which enables the patient to operate the device and directs the aerosol into the patient's lungs. The formulation comprises the drug, a liquefied gas propellant and, in many cases, stabilizing excipients. The actuator contains the mating discharge nozzle and generally includes a dust cap to prevent contamination.

To use the inhaler, the patient presses down on the top of the canister, with their thumb supporting the lower portion of the actuator. Actuation of the device releases a single metered dose of the formulation, which contains the medication either dissolved or suspended in the propellant. Breakup of the volatile propellant into droplets, followed by rapid evaporation of these droplets, results in the generation of an aerosol consisting of micrometer-sized medication particles that are then inhaled.

== Uses ==
Metered-dose inhalers are only one type of inhaler, but they are the most commonly used type. The replacement of chlorofluorocarbons propellants with hydrofluoroalkanes (HFA) resulted in the redesign of metered-dose inhalers in the 1990s. For one variety of beclomethasone inhalers, this redesign resulted in considerably smaller aerosol particles being produced and increased in potency by a factor of 2.6.

Metered-dose inhalers can be used to treat COPD, both in a stable state and during lung attacks.

== History ==
Before the invention of the MDI, asthma medication was delivered using a fragile and unreliable squeeze bulb nebulizer. The relatively crude nature of these devices also meant that the particles that they generated were relatively large, too large for effective drug delivery to the lungs. Nonetheless, these nebulizers paved the way for inhalation drug delivery, inspiring the MDI.

MDIs were first developed in 1955 by Riker Laboratories, now a subsidiary of 3M Healthcare. At that time, MDIs represented a convergence of two relatively new technologies, the CFC propellant and the Meshburg metering valve, originally designed for dispensing perfume. The initial design by Riker used a glass canister coated with vinyl plastic to improve its resilience. By 1956, Riker had developed two MDI-based products, the Medihaler-Ept containing epinephrine and the Medihaler-Iso containing isoprenaline. Both products are agonists that provide short-term relief from asthma symptoms and have now largely been replaced in asthma treatment by salbutamol, which is more selective.

== Spacers ==
Metered-dose inhalers are sometimes used with add-on devices referred to as holding chambers or spacers, tubes attached to the inhaler that act as a reservoir or holding chamber and reduce the speed at which the aerosol enters the mouth. They serve to hold the medication that is sprayed by the inhaler. This makes it easier to use the inhaler and helps ensure that more of the medication gets into the lungs instead of just into the mouth or the air. Proper use of a spacer can make an inhaler more effective in delivering medicine.

Spacers can be especially helpful to adults and children who find a regular metered dose inhaler hard to use. People who use corticosteroid inhalers should use a spacer to prevent getting the medicine in their mouth, where oral yeast infections and dysphonia can occur.

== Lifespan and replacement ==
The deposition of the content of drug formulation on the canister surface can result in a shorter shelf life of an MDI inhaler. Applying a suitable surface coating to the components helps to extend this shelf life. Over the years, various coating processes have been developed that can be applied to both the canister and valve to protect the contents from deposition and degradation. Gas plasma processing is an industrial technique carried out in a vacuum to coat the entire MDI inhaler. It involves constant or pulsed gas excitation by radio frequency (RF) or the microwave field to produce an energetic plasma. This coating ensures that the drug formulation does not stick to the interior wall of the MD inhaler and results in the patient receiving the prescribed dose of medication, extending the product's shelf-life.

A metered dose inhaler contains enough medication for a certain number of actuations (or "puffs") printed on the canister. Even though the inhaler may continue to work beyond that number of uses, the amount of medication delivered may not be correct. It is important to keep track of the number of times an inhaler is used so that it can be replaced after its recommended number of uses. For this reason, several regulatory authorities have requested that manufacturers add a dose counter or dose indicator to the actuator. Several inhalation products are now sold with a dose counter-actuator. Depending on the manufacturer and the product, inhalers are sold as a complete unit or the individual canister as a refill prescription.

== Inhaler technique and use ==
While MDIs are commonly used in the treatment of lung-based disorders, their use requires dexterity to complete the required sequential steps to achieve the application of these devices. Incorrect completion of one or more steps in using an MDI can substantially reduce the delivery of the administered medication and, consequently, its effectiveness and safety. Numerous studies have demonstrated that between 50-100% of patients do not use their inhaler devices correctly, with patients often unaware that they are using their inhaled medication incorrectly. Incorrect inhaler technique has been associated with poorer outcomes. Incorrect maintenance and cleaning of metered dose inhalers is also an issue identified by many users, highlighting the need for clear guidance for patients prescribed MDIs.

== Propellants ==
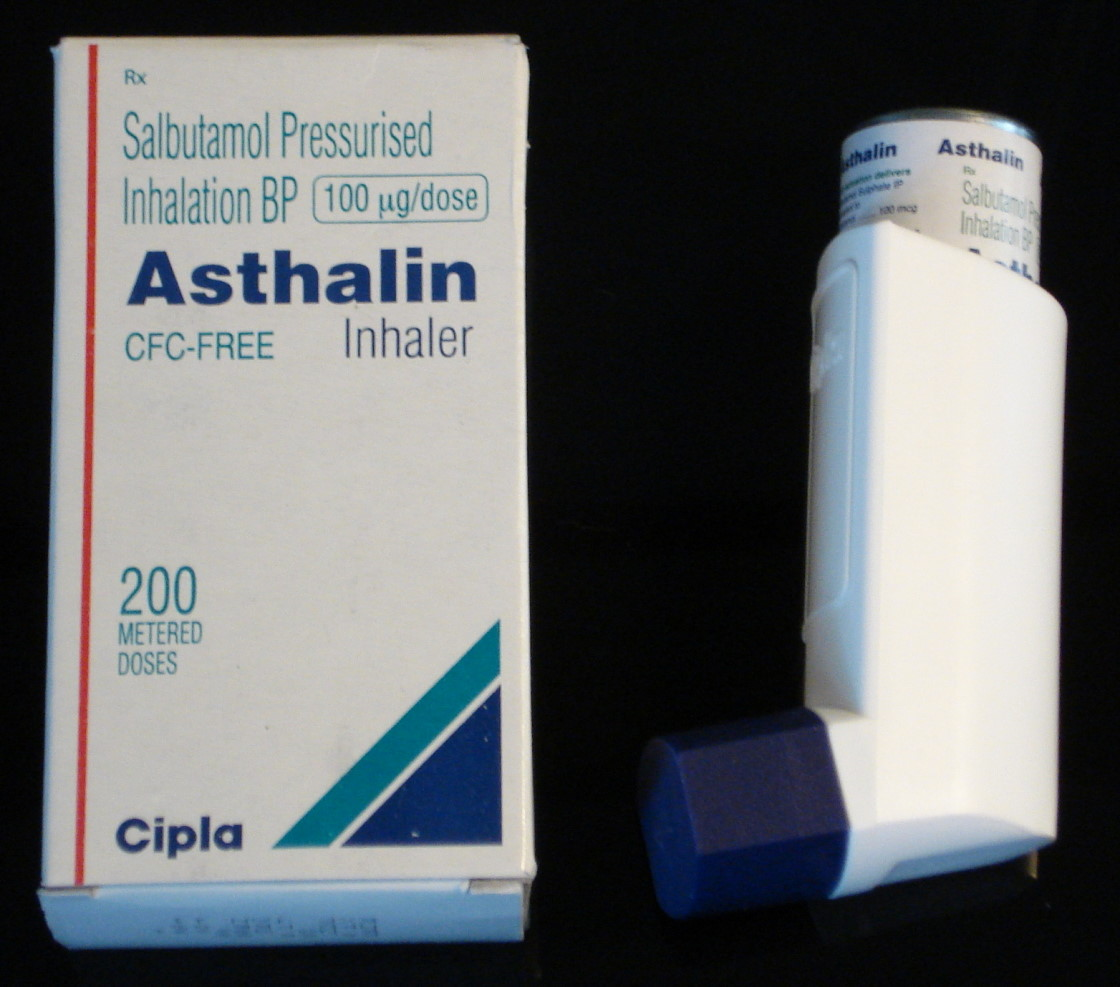
CFC-free Asthalin HFA inhaler

One of the most crucial components of an MDI is its propellant. The propellant provides the force to generate the aerosol cloud and is also the medium where the active component must be suspended or dissolved. Propellants in MDIs typically make up more than 99% of the delivered dose, so the properties of the propellant dominate more than any other individual factor. This is often overlooked in literature and in industry because so few propellants are used, and their contribution is often taken for granted. Suitable propellants must pass a stringent set of criteria, and they must:

- have a boiling point in the range of -100 to +30 °C
- have a density of approximately 1.2 to 1.5 g cm^{−3} (approximately that of the drug to be suspended or dissolved)
- have a vapour pressure of 40 to 80 psig
- have no toxicity to the patient
- be non-flammable
- be able to dissolve common additives (active ingredients should be either fully soluble or fully insoluble)

=== Chlorofluorocarbons (CFCs) ===
In the early days of MDIs, the most commonly used propellants were the chlorofluorocarbons CFC-11, CFC-12 and CFC-114.

In 2008, the Food and Drug Administration announced that inhalers using chlorofluorocarbons as a propellant, such as Primatene Mist, could no longer be manufactured or sold as of 2012. This followed from U.S. decision to agree to the 1987 Montreal Protocol on Substances that deplete the ozone layer.

=== Hydrofluorocarbons ===
Hydrofluorocarbon propellants have replaced CFC propellants. Concerns about the use of hydrofluorocarbon propellants have, however, since arisen since these compounds are potent greenhouse gases; propellants released during the use of a single inhaler result in a greenhouse footprint equivalent to greenhouse gases released during a 180-mile car journey.

=== Low GWP alternatives ===
New lower GWP propellants have been identified that can be used in MDIs, HFA-152a and HFO-1234ze(E). In 2025, the first inhaler using HFO-1234ze(E) was approved in the United Kingdom, for the treatment of COPD with Trixeo inhalers.

== Surfactant lipids ==
Phospholipids are important natural surfactant lipids. used to enhance penetration and bioavailability. Phospholipids reduce the high surface tension forces at the air-water interface within the alveoli, thereby reducing the pressure needed to expand the lungs. Thus, commercially available formulations of phospholipids have been designed to spread rapidly over an air-aqueous interface, thereby reducing what is otherwise a very high surface tension of water.

== See also ==
- Dry-powder inhaler
- Spray bottle
