= Terbutaline =

Chemical compound

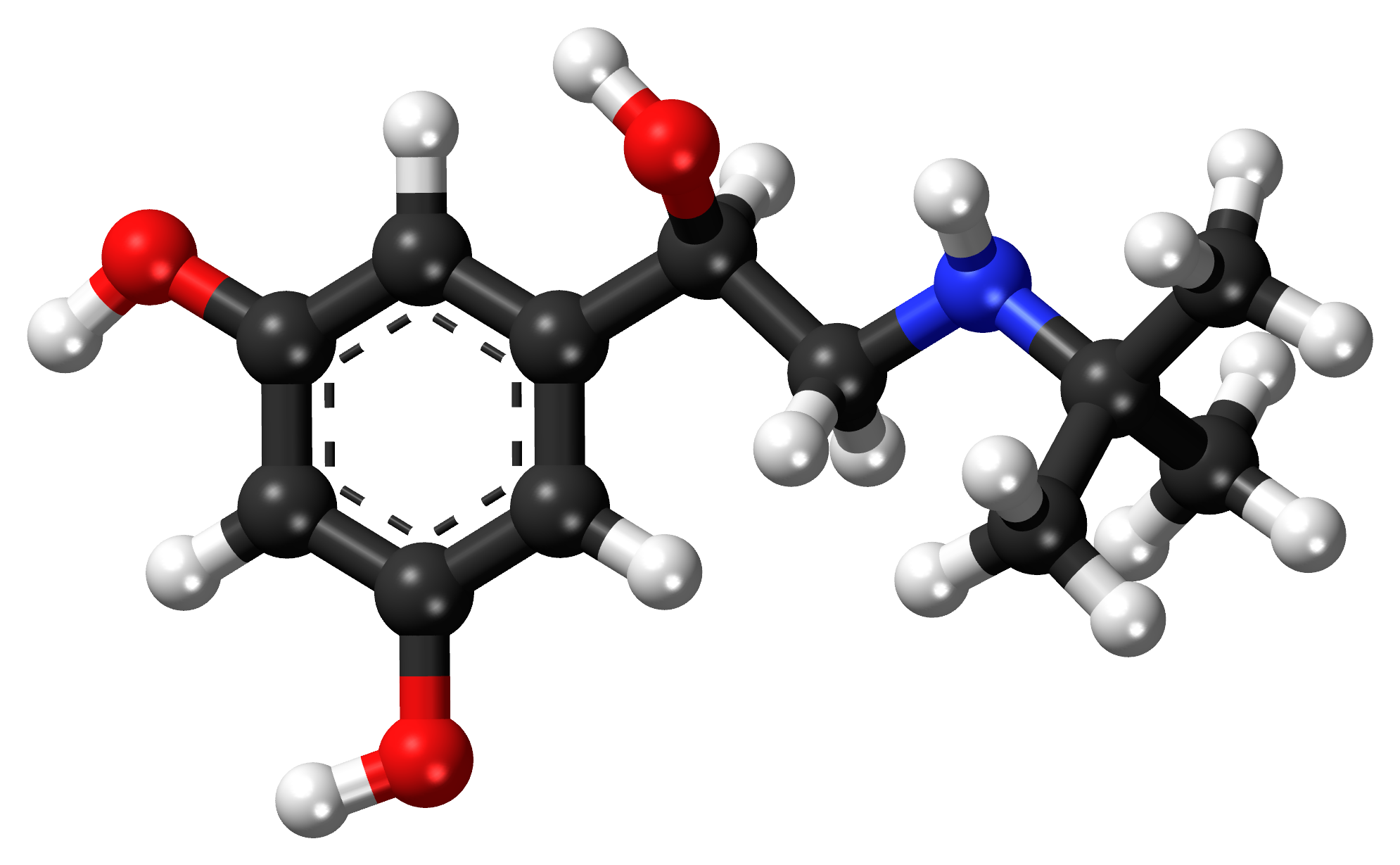
- Terbutaline (top), and (R)-(−)-terbutaline (bottom)

Clinical data
- AHFS/Drugs.com: Monograph
- MedlinePlus: a682144
- Pregnancy category: AU: A; C
- Routes of administration: Oral (tablets, oral solution), inhalational (DPI, nebulizer solution), SQ
- ATC code: R03AC03 (WHO) R03CC03 (WHO)

Legal status
- Legal status: AU: S4 (Prescription only); UK: POM (Prescription only)

Pharmacokinetic data
- Protein binding: 25%
- Metabolism: GI tract (oral), liver; CYP450: unknown
- Elimination half-life: 11–16 hours
- Excretion: urine 90% (60% unchanged), bile/faeces

Identifiers
- IUPAC name: (RS)-5-[2-(tert-Butylamino)-1-hydroxyethyl]benzene-1,3-diol
- CAS Number: 23031-25-6
- PubChem CID: 5403
- IUPHAR/BPS: 560
- DrugBank: DB00871
- ChemSpider: 5210
- UNII: N8ONU3L3PG
- KEGG: D08570
- ChEBI: CHEBI:9449
- ChEMBL: ChEMBL1760
- CompTox Dashboard (EPA): DTXSID7021310
- ECHA InfoCard: 100.041.244

Chemical and physical data
- Formula: C_{12}H_{19}NO_{3}
- Molar mass: 225.288 g·mol^{−1}
- 3D model (JSmol): Interactive image
- Chirality: Racemic mixture
- SMILES: Oc1cc(cc(O)c1)C(O)CNC(C)(C)C
- InChI: InChI=1S/C12H19NO3/c1-12(2,3)13-7-11(16)8-4-9(14)6-10(15)5-8/h4-6,11,13-16H,7H2,1-3H3; Key:XWTYSIMOBUGWOL-UHFFFAOYSA-N

Terbutaline, sold under the brand names Bricanyl and Marex among others, is a β_{2} adrenergic receptor agonist, used as a "reliever" inhaler in the management of asthma symptoms and as a tocolytic (anti-contraction medication) to delay preterm labor for up to 48 hours. This time can then be used to administer steroid injections to the mother which help fetal lung maturity and reduce complications of prematurity. It should not be used to prevent preterm labor or delay labor more than 48–72 hours. In February 2011, the Food and Drug Administration began requiring a black box warning on the drug's label. Pregnant women should not be given injections of the drug terbutaline for the prevention of preterm labor or for long-term (beyond 48–72 hours) management of preterm labor, and should not be given oral terbutaline for any type of prevention or treatment of preterm labor "due to the potential for serious maternal heart problems and death."

It was patented in 1966 and came into medical use in 1970. It is on the World Health Organization's List of Essential Medicines.

== Medical uses ==
Terbutaline is used as a fast-acting bronchodilator (often used as a short-term asthma treatment) and as a tocolytic to delay premature labor.

As an asthma treatment, the inhaled form of terbutaline starts working within 15 minutes and can last up to 6 hours. It is also sold as an injectable solution, an oral tablet, and as a syrup (in combination with guaifenesin).

Terbutaline is a pregnancy category C medication and is prescribed to stop contractions. After successful intravenous tocolysis, little evidence exists that oral terbutaline is effective. Terbutaline as a treatment for premature labor is an off-label use not approved by the US FDA, who have warned that oral terbutaline is not effective and can cause severe heart problems or death, and while injectable terbutaline can be used for premature labor in emergency situations in a hospital setting, it should only be used for short periods of time.

== Side effects ==
- Adult – tachycardia, anxiety, nervousness, tremors, headache, hyperglycemia, hypokalemia, hypotension and, rarely, pulmonary edema.
- Fetal – tachycardia and hypoglycemia.

== Pharmacology ==
The tertiary butyl group in terbutaline makes it more selective for β_{2} receptors. Since there is no hydroxy group on position 4 of the benzene ring, the molecule is less susceptible to metabolism by the enzyme catechol-O-methyl transferase.

== Chemistry ==
Terbutaline is synthesized by brominating 3,5-dibenzyloxyacetophenone into 3,5-dibenzyloxybromoacetophenone, which is reacted with N-benzyl-N-tert-butylamine, giving a ketone intermediate. Reduction of this product with H₂ over Pd/C leads to terbutaline.

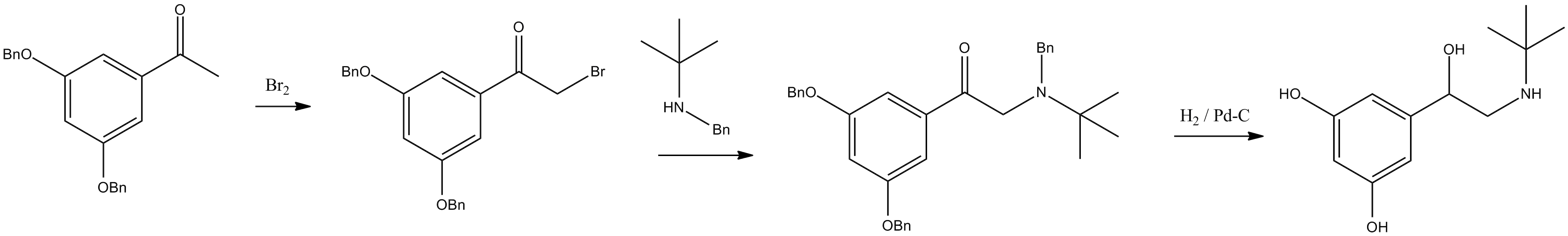

=== Stereochemistry ===
Terbutaline contains a stereocenter and consists of two enantiomers. This is a racemate, ie a 1:1 mixture of the (R)- and the (S)- forms:

Enantiomers of terbutaline
(R)-Terbutaline	(S)-Terbutaline

== Society and culture ==
=== Athletics ===
As with all β2-adrenergic receptor agonists, terbutaline is on the World Anti-Doping Agency's list of prohibited drugs, except when administered by inhalation and a Therapeutic Use Exemption (TUE) has been obtained in advance.

=== Brand names ===
Brand names include Astherin, Bronclyn, Brethine, Bricanyl, Brethaire, Marex, Terasma, and Terbulin.
