= Choline theophyllinate =

Pharmaceutical drug

Clinical data
- Trade names: Choledyl, Theocolin
- Other names: Oxtriphylline
- AHFS/Drugs.com: International Drug Names
- ATC code: R03DA02 (WHO)

Pharmacokinetic data
- Excretion: mainly via kidneys

Identifiers
- IUPAC name: (2-Hydroxyethyl)trimethylazanium; 1,3-dimethyl-2,6-dioxo-2,3,6,7-tetrahydro-1H-purin-7-ide
- CAS Number: 4499-40-5
- PubChem CID: 656652
- DrugBank: DB01303
- ChemSpider: 25044543; 571001
- UNII: 3K045XR58X
- KEGG: D02017
- ChEMBL: ChEMBL1200434
- CompTox Dashboard (EPA): DTXSID20894867
- ECHA InfoCard: 100.022.545

Chemical and physical data
- Formula: C_{12}H_{21}N_{5}O_{3}
- Molar mass: 283.332 g·mol^{−1}
- 3D model (JSmol): Interactive image
- SMILES: Cn1c(c-2ncnc2n(c1=O)C)[O-].C[N+](C)(C)CCO
- InChI: InChI=1S/C7H8N4O2.C5H14NO/c1-10-5-4(8-3-9-5)6(12)11(2)7(10)13;1-6(2,3)4-5-7/h3,12H,1-2H3;7H,4-5H2,1-3H3/q;+1/p-1; Key:SOELXOBIIIBLRJ-UHFFFAOYSA-M

Choline theophyllinate (INN), also known as oxtriphylline, is a cough medicine derived from xanthine that acts as a bronchodilator to open up airways in the lung. Chemically, it is a salt of choline and theophylline. It classifies as an expectorant. The drug is available under the brand names Choledyl and Choledyl SA, among others.
