= Beclometasone =

Chemical compound

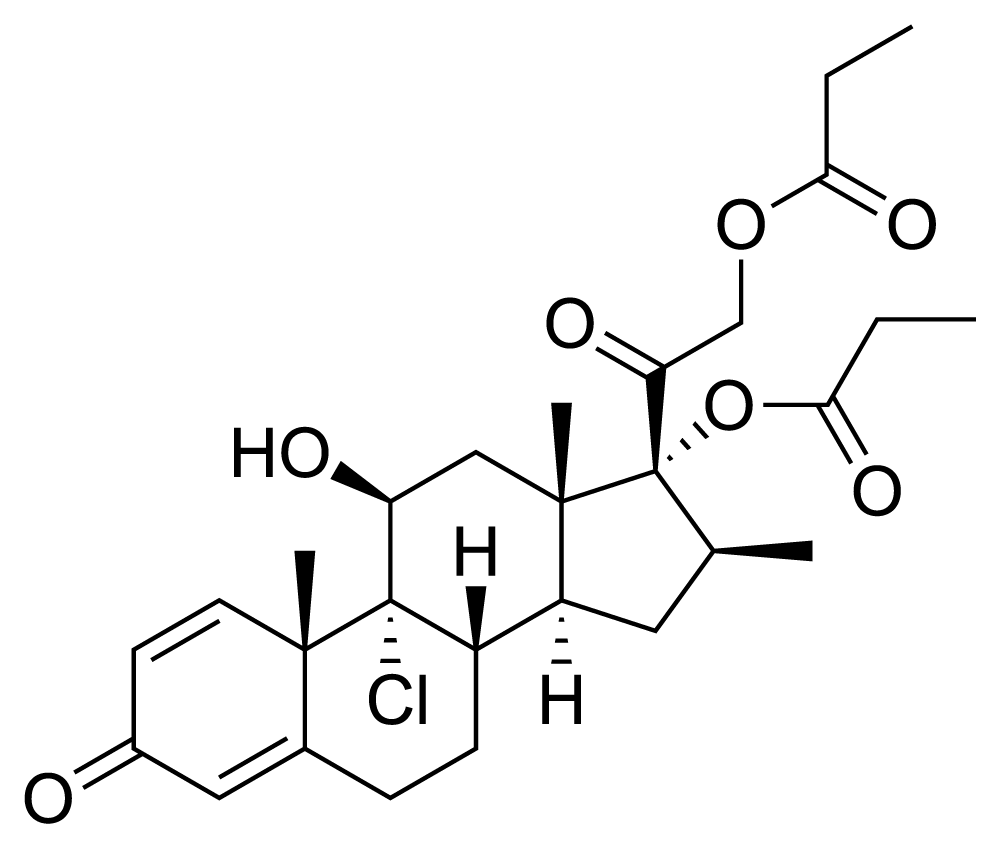

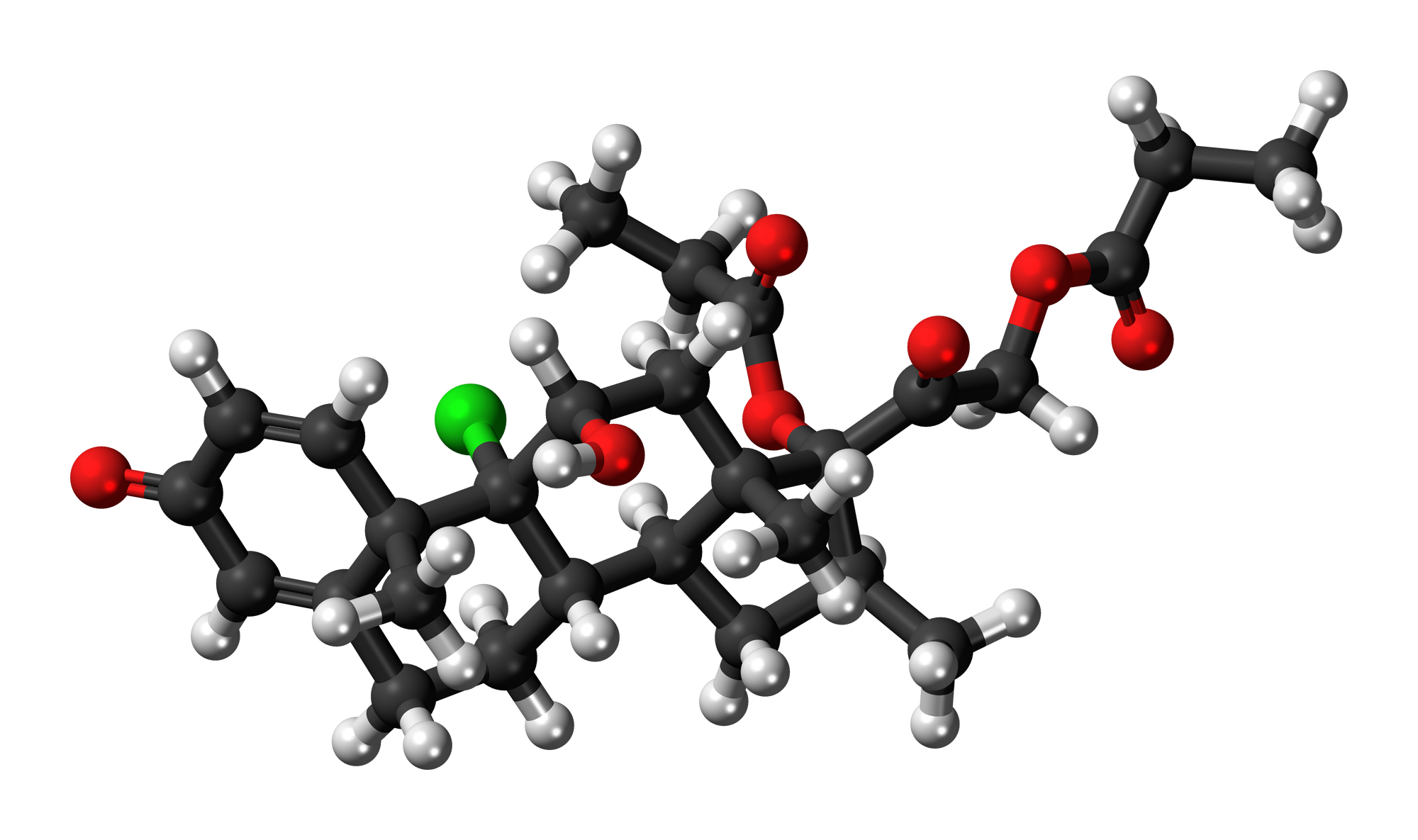

Clinical data
- Trade names: Vanceril, others
- Other names: Beclometasone dipropionate; beclomethasone dipropionate, beclomethasone (USAN US)
- AHFS/Drugs.com: Monograph
- MedlinePlus: a681047
- License data: US DailyMed: Beclomethasone
- Pregnancy category: AU: B3
- Routes of administration: Inhalation, intranasal, topical
- Drug class: Glucocorticoid
- ATC code: A07EA07 (WHO) D07AC15 (WHO), R01AD01 (WHO), R03BA01 (WHO)

Legal status
- Legal status: AU: S2 (Pharmacy medicine) / Schedule 4; UK: POM (Prescription only); US: ℞-only

Identifiers
- IUPAC name: (8S,9R,10S,11S,13S,14S,16S,17R)-9-chloro-11,17-dihydroxy-17-(2-hydroxyacetyl)-10,13,16-trimethyl-6,7,8,11,12,14,15,16-octahydrocyclopenta[a]phenanthren-3-one
- CAS Number: 4419-39-0; dipropionate: 5534-09-8
- PubChem CID: 20469; dipropionate: 21700
- IUPHAR/BPS: 5894
- DrugBank: dipropionate: DB00394
- ChemSpider: 20396
- UNII: KGZ1SLC28Z; dipropionate: 5B307S63B2
- KEGG: D07495; dipropionate: D00689
- ChEBI: CHEBI:3002
- ChEMBL: ChEMBL1200500
- CompTox Dashboard (EPA): DTXSID3048730
- ECHA InfoCard: 100.024.442

Chemical and physical data
- Formula: C_{22}H_{29}ClO_{5}
- Molar mass: 408.92 g·mol^{−1}
- 3D model (JSmol): Interactive image; dipropionate: Interactive image
- Melting point: 117 to 120 °C (243 to 248 °F) (dec.)
- SMILES: O=C1C=CC2(C(=C1)CCC3C4CC(C)C(O)(C(=O)CO)C4(C)CC(O)C32Cl)C; dipropionate: O=C(OCC(=O)[C@]3(OC(=O)CC)[C@]2(C[C@H](O)[C@]4(Cl)[C@@]/1(\C(=C/C(=O)\C=C\1)CC[C@H]4[C@@H]2C[C@@H]3C)C)C)CC
- InChI: InChI=1S/C22H29ClO5/c1-12-8-16-15-5-4-13-9-14(25)6-7-19(13,2)21(15,23)17(26)10-20(16,3)22(12,28)18(27)11-24/h6-7,9,12,15-17,24,26,28H,4-5,8,10-11H2,1-3H3/t12-,15-,16-,17-,19-,20-,21-,22-/m0/s1; Key:NBMKJKDGKREAPL-DVTGEIKXSA-N; dipropionate: InChI=1S/C28H37ClO7/c1-6-23(33)35-15-22(32)28(36-24(34)7-2)16(3)12-20-19-9-8-17-13-18(30)10-11-25(17,4)27(19,29)21(31)14-26(20,28)5/h10-11,13,16,19-21,31H,6-9,12,14-15H2,1-5H3/t16-,19-,20-,21-,25-,26-,27-,28-/m0/s1; Key:KUVIULQEHSCUHY-XYWKZLDCSA-N

Beclometasone or beclomethasone, sold under the brand name Vanceril among others, is a corticosteroid medication. It is available as an inhaler, cream, pills, and nasal spray. The inhaled form is used in the long-term management of asthma. The cream may be used for dermatitis and psoriasis. The pills have been used to treat ulcerative colitis. The nasal spray is used to treat allergic rhinitis and nasal polyps.

Common side effects with the inhaled form include respiratory infections, headaches, and throat inflammation. Serious side effects include an increased risk of infection, cataracts, Cushing's syndrome, and severe allergic reactions. Long-term use of the pill form may cause adrenal insufficiency. The pills may also cause mood or personality changes. The inhaled form is generally regarded as safe in pregnancy. Beclometasone is a glucocorticoid.

Beclomethasone, as beclomethasone dipropionate, was first patented in 1962 and used medically in 1972. It was approved for medical use in the United States in 1976. It is a therapeutic alternative on the World Health Organization's List of Essential Medicines. In 2023, it was the 351st most commonly prescribed medication in the United States, with more than 51,000 prescriptions.

== Medical uses ==
Beclometasone is indicated for maintenance treatment of asthma as prophylactic therapy; for the treatment of nasal symptoms associated with seasonal and perennial allergic rhinitis; and the relief of the symptoms of seasonal or perennial allergic and nonallergic (vasomotor) rhinitis.

== Side effects ==
Common side effects with the inhaled form include respiratory infections, headaches, and throat inflammation. Serious side effects include an increased risk of infection, cataracts, Cushing's syndrome, and severe allergic reactions. Long-term use of the pill form may cause adrenal insufficiency. The pills may also cause mood or personality changes. The inhaled form is generally regarded as safe in pregnancy.

Occasionally, it may cause a cough upon inhalation. Deposition on the tongue and throat may promote oral candidiasis, which appears as a white coating, possibly with irritation.

Nasal corticosteroids may be associated with central serous retinopathy.

== Pharmacology ==
Beclometasone is a glucocorticoid. Glucocorticoids are corticosteroids that bind to the glucocorticoid receptor that is present in almost every vertebrate animal cell. The activated glucocorticoid receptor-glucocorticoid complex up-regulates the expression of anti-inflammatory proteins in the nucleus (a process known as transactivation) and represses the expression of proinflammatory proteins in the cytosol by preventing the translocation of other transcription factors from the cytosol into the nucleus (transrepression).

== Society and culture ==
=== Names ===
Beclometasone dipropionate is the international nonproprietary name modified and beclomethasone dipropionate is the United States Adopted Name and former British Approved Name. It is a prodrug of the free form, beclometasone (INN). The prodrug beclometasone is marketed in Norway and Russia.

Clenil, Qvar, Cortis are brand names for the inhalers; Beconase, Alanase, Vancenase, Qnasl for the nasal spray or aerosol.
