= Glycopyrronium bromide =

Anticholinergic

Glycopyrronium bromide INN: Glycopyrronium
- Molecular structure of glycopyrronium bromide

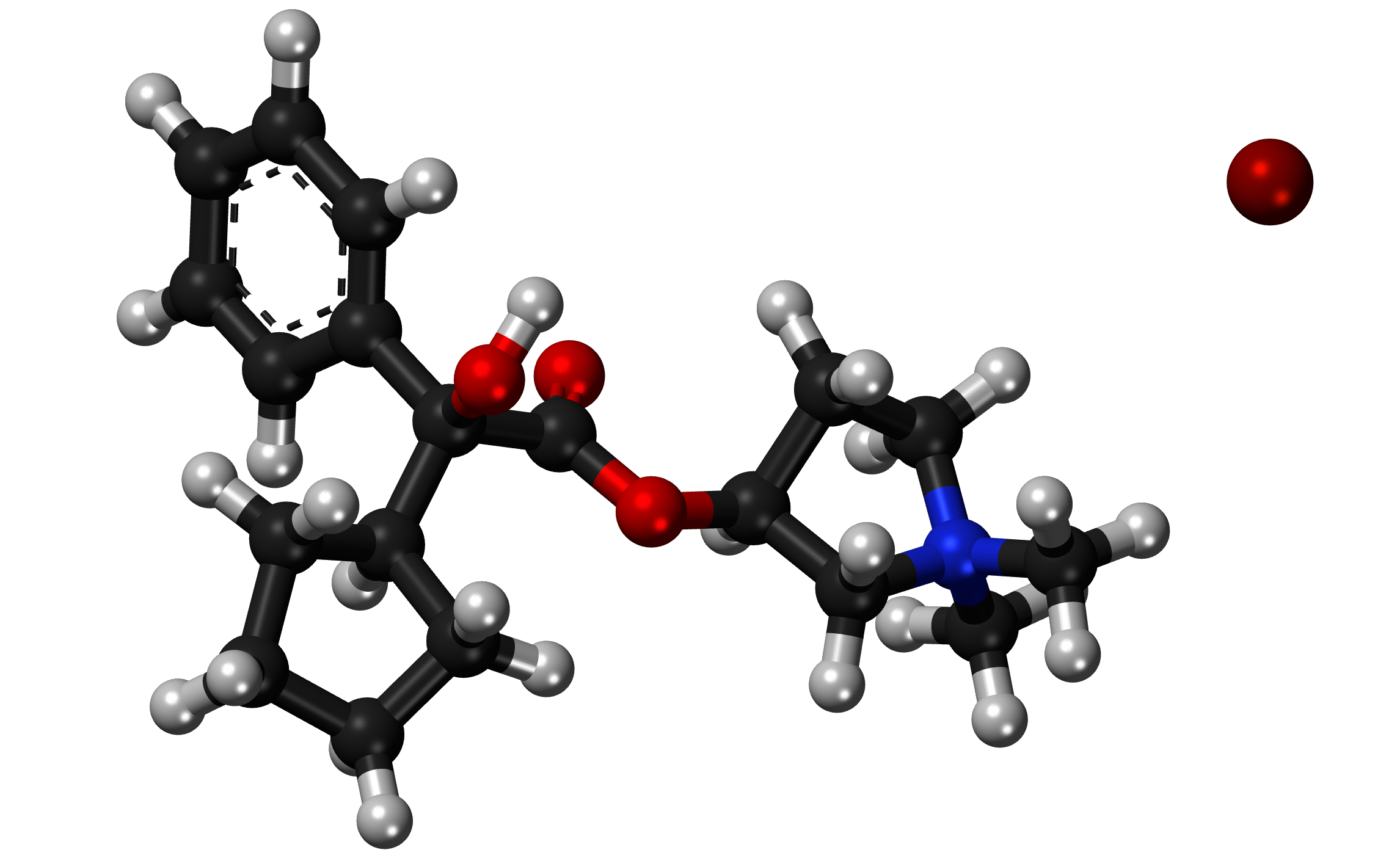
- 3D representation of a glycopyrronium bromide molecule

Clinical data
- Pronunciation: /ˌɡlaɪkoʊpaɪˈroʊniʌmˈbroʊmaɪd/ gly-koh-py-ROH-nee-um BROH-myd
- Trade names: Robinul, Cuvposa, Seebri, others
- Other names: glycopyrrolate (USAN US)
- AHFS/Drugs.com: Monograph
- MedlinePlus: a602014
- License data: US DailyMed: Glycopyrrolate
- Pregnancy category: AU: B2
- Routes of administration: By mouth, intravenous, inhalation, topical, injection, subcutaneous
- Drug class: Antimuscarinic (peripherally-selective)
- ATC code: A03AB02 (WHO) D11AA01 (WHO) R03BB06 (WHO)

Legal status
- Legal status: AU: S3 / S4; CA: ℞-only; UK: POM (Prescription only); US: ℞-only; EU: Rx-only; In general: ℞ (Prescription only)

Pharmacokinetic data
- Elimination half-life: 0.6–1.2 hours
- Excretion: 85% Kidney, unknown amount in the bile

Identifiers
- IUPAC name: 3-[2-Cyclopentyl(hydroxy)phenylacetoxy]-1,1-dimethylpyrrolidinium bromide
- CAS Number: 51186-83-5; as cation: 596-51-0
- PubChem CID: 3494; as cation: 11693
- IUPHAR/BPS: 7459
- DrugBank: DBSALT001183; as cation: DB00986
- ChemSpider: 11201; as cation: 3374
- UNII: V92SO9WP2I; as cation: A14FB57V1D
- KEGG: D00540; as cation: D10938
- ChEBI: CHEBI:90972
- ChEMBL: ChEMBL1201027; as cation: ChEMBL1201335
- CompTox Dashboard (EPA): DTXSID6023109
- ECHA InfoCard: 100.008.990

Chemical and physical data
- Formula: C_{19}H_{28}BrNO_{3}
- Molar mass: 398.341 g·mol^{−1}
- 3D model (JSmol): Interactive image; as cation: Interactive image
- SMILES: C[N+]1(CCC(C1)OC(=O)C(C2CCCC2)(C3=CC=CC=C3)O)C.[Br-]; as cation: C[N+]1(CCC(C1)OC(=O)C(C2CCCC2)(C3=CC=CC=C3)O)C
- InChI: InChI=1S/C19H28NO3.BrH/c1-20(2)13-12-17(14-20)23-18(21)19(22,16-10-6-7-11-16)15-8-4-3-5-9-15;/h3-5,8-9,16-17,22H,6-7,10-14H2,1-2H3;1H/q+1;/p-1; Key:VPNYRYCIDCJBOM-UHFFFAOYSA-M; as cation: InChI=1S/C19H28NO3/c1-20(2)13-12-17(14-20)23-18(21)19(22,16-10-6-7-11-16)15-8-4-3-5-9-15/h3-5,8-9,16-17,22H,6-7,10-14H2,1-2H3/q+1; Key:ANGKOCUUWGHLCE-UHFFFAOYSA-N

Glycopyrronium bromide is a medication of the muscarinic anticholinergic group. It does not cross the blood–brain barrier and consequently has few to no central effects. It can be administered orally, intravenously, topically, or via inhalation. It is a synthetic quaternary ammonium compound. The cation, which is the active moiety, is called glycopyrronium (INN) or glycopyrrolate (USAN).

The most common side effects include irritability, flushing, nasal congestion, reduced secretions in the airways, dry mouth, constipation, diarrhea, nausea and vomiting, and urinary retention.

In September 2012, glycopyrronium was approved for medical use in the European Union. In June 2018, glycopyrronium was approved by the U.S. Food and Drug Administration (FDA) to treat excessive underarm sweating, becoming the first drug developed specifically to reduce excessive sweating. It is on the World Health Organization's List of Essential Medicines.

== Medical uses ==
Glycopyrronium was first used in 1961 to treat peptic ulcers. Since 1975, intravenous glycopyrronium has been used before surgery to reduce salivary, tracheobronchial, and pharyngeal secretions. It is also used in conjunction with neostigmine, a neuromuscular blocking reversal agent, to prevent neostigmine's muscarinic effects such as bradycardia. It can be administered to raise the heart rate in reflex bradycardia as a result of a vasovagal reaction, which often will also increase the blood pressure.

It is also used to reduce excessive saliva (sialorrhea), and to treat Ménière's disease.

It has been used topically and orally to treat hyperhidrosis, in particular, gustatory hyperhidrosis and generalized hyperhidrosis.

When inhaled, it is used to treat chronic obstructive pulmonary disease (COPD). Doses for inhalation are much lower than oral ones, so that swallowing a dose will not have an effect.

== Side effects ==
Dry mouth, urinary retention, headaches, vomiting, diarrhea, constipation, and blurry vision are possible side effects of the medication.

== Pharmacology ==
=== Mechanism of action ===
Glycopyrronium competitively blocks muscarinic receptors, thus inhibiting cholinergic transmission.

=== Pharmacokinetics ===
Glycopyrronium bromide affects the gastrointestinal tract, liver and kidney but has a very limited effect on the brain and the central nervous system. In horse studies, after a single intravenous infusion, the observed tendencies of glycopyrronium followed a tri-exponential equation, by rapid disappearance from the blood followed by a prolonged terminal phase. Excretion was mainly in urine and in the form of an unchanged drug. Glycopyrronium has a relatively slow diffusion rate, and in a standard comparison to atropine, is more resistant to penetration through the blood-brain barrier and placenta.

== Research ==
It has been studied in asthma.
