= List of corticosteroids =

Steroid ring system.

This is a list of corticosteroids (glucocorticoids and mineralocorticoids) or derivatives of cortisol (hydrocortisone). Most esters of these corticosteroids are not included in this list; for esters, see here instead.

The most common structural modifications in synthetic corticosteroids include 1(2)-dehydrogenation, 6α-, 9α-, 16α-, and 16β-substitution (with a halogen or methyl group), 16α,17α-acetonidation, and 17α- and 21-esterification.

== Natural ==
Cortisol (hydrocortisone), the major endogenous glucocorticoid.

- 11-Dehydrocorticosterone (11-oxocorticosterone, 17-deoxycortisone) = 21-hydroxypregn-4-ene-3,11,20-trione
- 11-Deoxycorticosterone (deoxycortone, desoxycortone; 21-hydroxyprogesterone) = 21-hydroxypregn-4-ene-3,20-dione
- 11-Deoxycortisol (cortodoxone, cortexolone) = 17α,21-dihydroxypregn-4-ene-3,20-dione
- 11-Ketoprogesterone (11-oxoprogesterone; Ketogestin) = pregn-4-ene-3,11,20-trione
- 11β-Hydroxypregnenolone = 3β,11β-dihydroxypregn-5-en-20-one
- 11β-Hydroxyprogesterone (21-deoxycorticosterone) = 11β-hydroxypregn-4-ene-3,20-dione
- 11β,17α,21-Trihydroxypregnenolone = 3β,11β,17α,21-tetrahydroxypregn-5-en-20-one
- 17α,21-Dihydroxypregnenolone = 3β,17α,21-trihydroxypregn-5-en-20-one
- 17α-Hydroxypregnenolone = 3β,17α-dihydroxypregn-5-en-20-one
- 17α-Hydroxyprogesterone = 17α-hydroxypregn-4-ene-3,11,20-trione
- 18-Hydroxy-11-deoxycorticosterone = 18,21-dihydroxypregn-4-ene-3,20-dione
- 18-Hydroxycorticosterone = 11β,18,21-trihydroxypregn-4-ene-3,20-dione
- 18-Hydroxyprogesterone = 18-hydroxypregn-4-ene-3,20-dione
- 21-Deoxycortisol = 11β,17α-dihydroxypregn-4-ene-3,20-dione,
- 21-Deoxycortisone = 17α-hydroxypregn-4-ene-3,11,20-trione
- 21-Hydroxypregnenolone (prebediolone) = 3β,21-dihydroxypregn-5-en-20-one
- Aldosterone = 11β,21-dihydroxypregn-4-ene-3,18,20-trione
- Corticosterone (17-deoxycortisol) = 11β,21-dihydroxypregn-4-ene-3,20-dione
- Cortisol (hydrocortisone) = 11β,17α,21-trihydroxypregn-4-ene-3,20-dione
- Cortisone = 17α,21-dihydroxypregn-4-ene-3,11,20-trione
- Pregnenolone = pregn-5-en-3β-ol-20-one
- Progesterone = pregn-4-ene-3,20-dione

The glucocorticoid activity of progesterone and 17α-hydroxyprogesterone is very weak (>100-fold less than that of cortisol).

The above list includes precursors and intermediates in corticosteroid biosynthesis.

== Synthetic ==
=== Progesterone-type ===
- Flugestone (flurogestone) = 9α-fluoro-11β,17α-dihydroxypregn-4-ene-3,20-dione
- Fluorometholone = 6α-methyl-9α-fluoro-11β,17α-dihydroxypregna-1,4-diene-3,20-dione
- Medrysone (hydroxymethylprogesterone) = 6α-methyl-11β-hydroxypregn-4-ene-3,20-dione
- Prebediolone acetate (21-acetoxypregnenolone) = 3β,21-dihydroxypregn-5-en-20-one 21-acetate

In addition to the above, various progesterone derivative progestins such as chlormadinone acetate, cyproterone acetate, medrogestone, medroxyprogesterone acetate, megestrol acetate, and segesterone acetate possess weak glucocorticoid activity which can manifest clinically at high dosages.

=== Hydrocortisone-type ===
- Chloroprednisone = 6α-chloro-17α,21-dihydroxypregna-1,4-diene-3,11,20-trione
- Cloprednol = 6-chloro-11β,17α,21-trihydroxypregna-1,4,6-triene-3,20-dione
- Difluprednate = 6α,9α-difluoro-11β,17α,21-trihydroxypregna-1,4-diene-3,20-dione 17α-butyrate 21-acetate
- Fludrocortisone = 9α-fluoro-11β,17α,21-trihydroxypregn-4-ene-3,20-dione
- Fluocinolone = 6α,9α-difluoro-11β,16α,17α,21-tetrahydroxypregna-1,4-diene-3,20-dione
- Fluperolone = 9α-fluoro-11β,17α,21-trihydroxy-21-methylpregna-1,4-diene-3,20-dione
- Fluprednisolone = 6α-fluoro-11β,17α,21-trihydroxypregna-1,4-diene-3,20-dione
- Loteprednol = 11β,17α,dihydroxy-21-oxa-21-chloromethylpregna-1,4-diene-3,20-dione
- Methylprednisolone = 6α-methyl-11β,17α,21-trihydroxypregna-1,4-diene-3,20-dione
- Prednicarbate = 11β,17α,21-trihydroxypregna-1,4-diene-3,20-dione 17α-ethylcarbonate 21-propionate
- Prednisolone = 11β,17α,21-trihydroxypregna-1,4-diene-3,20-dione
- Prednisone = 17α,21-dihydroxypregna-1,4-diene-3,11,20-trione
- Tixocortol = 11β,17α-dihydroxy-21-sulfanylpregn-4-ene-3,20-dione
- Triamcinolone = 9α-fluoro-11β,16α,17α,21-tetrahydroxypregna-1,4-diene-3,20-dione

=== Methasone-type (16-methylated) ===
Dexamethasone, one of the most widely used synthetic glucocorticoids.

- Alclometasone = 7α-chloro-11β,17α,21-trihydroxy-16α-methylpregna-1,4-diene-3,20-dione
- Beclometasone = 9α-chloro-11β,17α,21-trihydroxy-16β-methylpregna-1,4-diene-3,20-dione
- Betamethasone = 9α-fluoro-11β,17α,21-trihydroxy-16β-methylpregna-1,4-diene-3,20-dione
- Clobetasol = 9α-fluoro-11β,17α-dihydroxy-16β-methyl-21-chloropregna-1,4-diene-3,20-dione
- Clobetasone = 9α-fluoro-16β-methyl-17α-hydroxy-21-chloropregna-1,4-diene-3,11,20-trione
- Clocortolone = 6α-fluoro-9α-chloro-11β,21-dihydroxy-16α-methylpregna-1,4-diene-3,20-dione
- Desoximetasone = 9α-fluoro-11β,21-dihydroxy-16α-methylpregna-1,4-diene-3,20-dione
- Dexamethasone = 9α-fluoro-11β,17α,21-trihydroxy-16α-methylpregna-1,4-diene-3,20-dione
- Diflorasone = 6α,9α-difluoro-11β,17α,21-trihydroxy-16β-methylpregna-1,4-diene-3,20-dione
- Difluocortolone = 6α,9α-difluoro-11β,21-dihydroxy-16α-methylpregna-1,4-diene-3,20-dione
- Fluclorolone = 6α-fluoro-9α,11β-dichloro-16α,17α,21-trihydroxypregna-1,4-dien-3,20-dione
- Flumetasone = 6α,9α-difluoro-11β,17α,21-trihydroxy-16α-methylpregna-1,4-diene-3,20-dione
- Fluocortin = 6α-fluoro-11β,21-dihydroxy-16α-methylpregna-1,4-diene-3,20,21-trione
- Fluocortolone = 6α-fluoro-11β,21-dihydroxy-16α-methylpregna-1,4-diene-3,20-dione
- Fluprednidene = 9α-fluoro-11β,17α,21-trihydroxy-16-methylenepregna-1,4-diene-3,20-dione
- Fluticasone = 6α,9α-difluoro-11β,17α-dihydroxy-16α-methyl-21-thia-21-fluoromethylpregna-1,4-dien-3,20-dione
- Fluticasone furoate = 6α,9α-difluoro-11β,17α-dihydroxy-16α-methyl-21-thia-21-fluoromethylpregna-1,4-dien-3,20-dione 17α-(2-furoate)
- Halometasone = 2-chloro-6α,9α-difluoro-11β,17α,21-trihydroxy-16α-methylpregna-1,4-diene-3,20-dione
- Meprednisone = 16β-methyl-17α,21-dihydroxypregna-1,4-diene-3,11,20-trione
- Mometasone = 9α,21-dichloro-11β,17α-dihydroxy-16α-methylpregna-1,4-diene-3,20-dione
- Mometasone furoate = 9α,21-dichloro-11β,17α-dihydroxy-16α-methylpregna-1,4-diene-3,20-dione 17α-(2-furoate)
- Paramethasone = 6α-fluoro-11β,17α,21-trihydroxy-16α-methylpregna-1,4-diene-3,20-dione
- Prednylidene = 11β,17α,21-trihydroxy-16-methylenepregna-1,4-diene-3,20-dione
- Rimexolone = 11β-hydroxy-16α,17α,21-trimethylpregna-1,4-dien-3,20-dione
- Ulobetasol (halobetasol) = 6α,9α-difluoro-11β,17α-dihydroxy-16β-methyl-21-chloropregna-1,4-diene-3,20-dione

=== Acetonides and related ===
- Amcinonide = 9α-fluoro-11β,16α,17α,21-tetrahydroxypregna-1,4-diene-3,20-dione cyclic 16α,17α-acetal with cyclopentanone, 21-acetate
- Budesonide = 11β,16α,17α,21-tetrahydroxypregna-1,4-diene-3,20-dione cyclic 16α,17α-acetal with butyraldehyde
- Ciclesonide = 11β,16α,17α,21-tetrahydroxypregna-1,4-diene-3,20-dione cyclic 16α,17α-acetal with (R)-cyclohexanecarboxaldehyde, 21-isobutyrate
- Deflazacort = 11β,21-dihydroxy-2'-methyl-5'H-pregna-1,4-dieno[17,16-d]oxazole-3,20-dione 21-acetate
- Desonide = 11β,16α,17α,21-tetrahydroxypregna-1,4-diene-3,20-dione cyclic 16α,17α-acetal with acetone
- Formocortal (fluoroformylone) = 3-(2-chloroethoxy)-9α-fluoro-11β,16α,17α,21-tetrahydroxy-20-oxopregna-3,5-diene-6-carboxaldehyde cyclic 16α,17α-acetal with acetone, 21-acetate
- Fluclorolone acetonide (flucloronide) = 6α-fluoro-9α,11β-dichloro-16α,17α,21-trihydroxypregna-1,4-dien-3,20-dione cyclic 16α,17α-acetal with acetone
- Fludroxycortide (flurandrenolone, flurandrenolide) = 6α-fluoro-11β,16α,17α,21-tetrahydroxypregn-4-ene-3,20-dione cyclic 16α,17α-acetal with acetone
- Flunisolide = 6α-fluoro-11β,16α,17α,21-tetrahydroxypregna-1,4-diene-3,20-dione cyclic 16α,17α-acetal with acetone
- Fluocinolone acetonide = 6α,9α-difluoro-11β,16α,17α,21-tetrahydroxypregna-1,4-diene-3,20-dione cyclic 16α,17α-acetal with acetone
- Fluocinonide = 6α,9α-difluoro-11β,16α,17α,21-tetrahydroxypregna-1,4-diene-3,20-dione cyclic 16α,17α-acetal with acetone, 21-acetate
- Halcinonide = 9α-fluoro-11β,16α,17α-trihydroxy-21-chloropregn-4-ene-3,20-dione cyclic 16α,17α-acetal with acetone
- Triamcinolone acetonide = 9α-fluoro-11β,16α,17α,21-tetrahydroxypregna-1,4-diene-3,20-dione cyclic 16α,17α-acetal with acetone

=== Others ===
- Cortivazol = 6,16α-dimethyl-11β,17α,21-trihydroxy-2'-phenyl[3,2-c]pyrazolopregna-4,6-dien-20-one 21-acetate
- RU-28362 = 6-methyl-11β,17β-dihydroxy-17α-(1-propynyl)androsta-1,4,6-trien-3-one

== See also ==
- List of steroids
- List of corticosteroid cyclic ketals
- List of corticosteroid esters
