= Methasone =

Class of corticosteroids

The methasones (or metasones) are a class of corticosteroids which are generally used in dermatology. They are defined by substitution with a methyl group at the C16α or C16β position of the pregnane steroid nucleus.

Examples of methasones include alclometasone, amelometasone, beclometasone, betamethasone, cormetasone, desoximetasone, dexamethasone, flumetasone, halometasone, icometasone, mometasone, and paramethasone, among others.

Fluprednidene and prednylidene are corticosteroids which feature a methylene group instead of a methyl group at the C16 position while fluocinolone and triamcinolone are corticosteroids which feature a hydroxyl group instead of a methyl group at the C16α position.

== See also ==
- List of corticosteroids
