= C22H29FO4 =

The molecular formula C_{22}H_{29}FO_{4} (molar mass: 376.46 g/mol) may refer to:

- Desoximetasone
- Doxibetasol
- Fluocortolone
- Fluorometholone, also known as 6α-methyl-9α-fluoro-11β,17α-dihydroxypregna-1,4-diene-3,20-dione
