= ATC code D07 =

ATC code D07 Corticosteroids, dermatological preparations is a therapeutic subgroup of the Anatomical Therapeutic Chemical Classification System, a system of alphanumeric codes developed by the World Health Organization (WHO) for the classification of drugs and other medical products. Subgroup D07 is part of the anatomical group D Dermatologicals.

Codes for veterinary use (ATCvet codes) can be created by placing the letter Q in front of the human ATC code: for example, QD07. ATCvet codes without corresponding human ATC codes are cited with the leading Q in the following list.
National versions of the ATC classification may include additional codes not present in this list, which follows the WHO version.

== D07A Corticosteroids, plain ==
=== D07AA Corticosteroids, weak (group I) ===
D07AA01 Methylprednisolone
D07AA02 Hydrocortisone
D07AA03 Prednisolone

=== D07AB Corticosteroids, moderately potent (group II) ===
D07AB01 Clobetasone
D07AB02 Hydrocortisone butyrate
D07AB03 Flumetasone
D07AB04 Fluocortin
D07AB05 Fluperolone
D07AB06 Fluorometholone
D07AB07 Fluprednidene
D07AB08 Desonide
D07AB09 Triamcinolone
D07AB10 Alclometasone
D07AB11 Hydrocortisone buteprate
D07AB19 Dexamethasone
D07AB21 Clocortolone
D07AB30 Combinations of corticosteroids

=== D07AC Corticosteroids, potent (group III) ===
D07AC01 Betamethasone
D07AC02 Fluclorolone
D07AC03 Desoximetasone
D07AC04 Fluocinolone acetonide
D07AC05 Fluocortolone
D07AC06 Diflucortolone
D07AC07 Fludroxycortide
D07AC08 Fluocinonide
D07AC09 Budesonide
D07AC10 Diflorasone
D07AC11 Amcinonide
D07AC12 Halometasone
D07AC13 Mometasone furoate
D07AC14 Methylprednisolone aceponate
D07AC15 Beclometasone
D07AC16 Hydrocortisone aceponate
D07AC17 Fluticasone
D07AC18 Prednicarbate
D07AC19 Difluprednate
D07AC21 Ulobetasol
QD07AC90 Resocortol butyrate

=== D07AD Corticosteroids, very potent (group IV) ===
D07AD01 Clobetasol
D07AD02 Halcinonide

== D07B Corticosteroids, combinations with antiseptics ==
=== D07BA Corticosteroids, weak, combinations with antiseptics ===
D07BA01 Prednisolone and antiseptics
D07BA04 Hydrocortisone and antiseptics

=== D07BB Corticosteroids, moderately potent, combinations with antiseptics ===
D07BB01 Flumetasone and antiseptics
D07BB02 Desonide and antiseptics
D07BB03 Triamcinolone and antiseptics
D07BB04 Hydrocortisone butyrate and antiseptics

=== D07BC Corticosteroids, potent, combinations with antiseptics ===
D07BC01 Betamethasone and antiseptics
D07BC02 Fluocinolone acetonide and antiseptics
D07BC03 Fluocortolone and antiseptics
D07BC04 Diflucortolone and antiseptics

== D07C Corticosteroids, combinations with antibiotics ==
=== D07CA Corticosteroids, weak, combinations with antibiotics ===
D07CA01 Hydrocortisone and antibiotics
D07CA02 Methylprednisolone and antibiotics
D07CA03 Prednisolone and antibiotics

=== D07CB Corticosteroids, moderately potent, combinations with antibiotics ===
D07CB01 Triamcinolone and antibiotics
D07CB02 Fluprednidene and antibiotics
D07CB03 Fluorometholone and antibiotics
D07CB04 Dexamethasone and antibiotics
D07CB05 Flumetasone and antibiotics

=== D07CC Corticosteroids, potent, combinations with antibiotics ===
D07CC01 Betamethasone and antibiotics
D07CC02 Fluocinolone acetonide and antibiotics
D07CC03 Fludroxycortide and antibiotics
D07CC04 Beclometasone and antibiotics
D07CC05 Fluocinonide and antibiotics
D07CC06 Fluocortolone and antibiotics

=== D07CD Corticosteroids, very potent, combinations with antibiotics ===
D07CD01 Clobetasol and antibiotics

== D07X Corticosteroids, other combinations ==
=== D07XA Corticosteroids, weak, other combinations ===
D07XA01 Hydrocortisone
D07XA02 Prednisolone

=== D07XB Corticosteroids, moderately potent, other combinations ===
D07XB01 Flumetasone
D07XB02 Triamcinolone
D07XB03 Fluprednidene
D07XB04 Fluorometholone
D07XB05 Dexamethasone
D07XB30 Combinations of corticosteroids

=== D07XC Corticosteroids, potent, other combinations ===
D07XC01 Betamethasone
D07XC02 Desoximetasone
D07XC03 Mometasone
D07XC04 Diflucortolone
D07XC05 Fluocortolone

=== D07XD Corticosteroids, very potent, other combinations ===
Empty group

== See also ==
- Topical steroid
