= C22H29ClO5 =

The molecular formula C_{22}H_{29}ClO_{5} may refer to:

- Alclometasone, a synthetic corticosteroid for topical dermatologic use
- Icometasone, a synthetic glucocorticoid corticosteroid which was never marketed
