= C22H27FO5 =

The molecular formula C_{22}H_{27}FO_{5} (molar mass: 390.45 g/mol) may refer to:

- Fluocortin, a corticosteroid
- Fluprednidene, a synthetic glucocorticoid corticosteroid
