= C22H29FO5 =

The molecular formula C_{22}H_{29}FO_{5} (molar mass: 392.46 g/mol, exact mass: 392.1999 u) may refer to:

- Betamethasone
- Dexamethasone
- Fluperolone
- Paramethasone
