= C22H28F2O5 =

The molecular formula C_{22}H_{28}F_{2}O_{5} may refer to:

- Diflorasone, a synthetic glucocorticoid corticosteroid
- Flumetasone, a corticosteroid for topical use
