= Flumetasone pivalate =

Chemical compound

Clinical data
- Other names: Flumetasone 21-pivalate
- Drug class: Corticosteroid; Glucocorticoid

Identifiers
- IUPAC name: (6S,8S,9R,10S,11S,13S,14S,16R,17R)-6,9-Difluoro-11,17-dihydroxy-17-(2-(2,2-dimethylpropionyl)oxyacetyl)-10,13,16-trimethyl-6,7,8,11,12,14,15,16-octahydrocyclopenta[a]phenanthren-3-one
- CAS Number: 2002-29-1
- PubChem CID: 443980
- IUPHAR/BPS: 7075
- ChemSpider: 392021
- UNII: 0DV09X6F21
- KEGG: D01464
- ChEBI: CHEBI:31620
- ChEMBL: ChEMBL1200877
- CompTox Dashboard (EPA): DTXSID7049005
- ECHA InfoCard: 100.016.275

Chemical and physical data
- Formula: C_{27}H_{36}F_{2}O_{6}
- Molar mass: 494.576 g·mol^{−1}
- 3D model (JSmol): Interactive image
- SMILES: C[C@@H]1C[C@H]2[C@@H]3C[C@@H](C4=CC(=O)C=C[C@@]4([C@]3([C@H](C[C@@]2([C@]1(C(=O)COC(=O)C(C)(C)C)O)C)O)F)C)F
- InChI: InChI=1S/C27H36F2O6/c1-14-9-16-17-11-19(28)18-10-15(30)7-8-24(18,5)26(17,29)20(31)12-25(16,6)27(14,34)21(32)13-35-22(33)23(2,3)4/h7-8,10,14,16-17,19-20,31,34H,9,11-13H2,1-6H3/t14-,16+,17+,19+,20+,24+,25+,26+,27+/m1/s1; Key:JWRMHDSINXPDHB-OJAGFMMFSA-N

Flumetasone pivalate is a synthetic glucocorticoid corticosteroid and a corticosteroid ester. It is the 21-acetate ester of flumetasone.
