= Diflucortolone =

Chemical compound

Clinical data
- Other names: Difluocortolone
- AHFS/Drugs.com: Micromedex Detailed Consumer Information
- ATC code: D07AC06 (WHO) D07XC04 (WHO) (combinations)

Identifiers
- CAS Number: 2607-06-9
- PubChem CID: 11954369
- DrugBank: DB09095
- ChemSpider: 10128664
- UNII: K253365DXI
- KEGG: D03812
- CompTox Dashboard (EPA): DTXSID50180705
- ECHA InfoCard: 100.018.203

Chemical and physical data
- Formula: C_{22}H_{28}F_{2}O_{4}
- Molar mass: 394.459 g·mol^{−1}
- 3D model (JSmol): Interactive image
- SMILES: C[C@@H]1C[C@H]2[C@@H]3C[C@@H](C4=CC(=O)C=C[C@@]4([C@]3([C@H](C[C@@]2([C@H]1C(=O)CO)C)O)F)C)F
- InChI: InChI=1S/C22H28F2O4/c1-11-6-13-14-8-16(23)15-7-12(26)4-5-21(15,3)22(14,24)18(28)9-20(13,2)19(11)17(27)10-25/h4-5,7,11,13-14,16,18-19,25,28H,6,8-10H2,1-3H3/t11-,13+,14+,16+,18+,19-,20+,21+,22+/m1/s1; Key:OGPWIDANBSLJPC-RFPWEZLHSA-N

Diflucortolone (INN), or difluocortolone, is a corticosteroid.

== See also ==
- Diflucortolone valerate
