= CYP11B3 =

cytochrome P450, family 11, subfamily b, polypeptide 3

Identifiers
- Organism: Rattus norvegicus
- Symbol: CYP11B3
- Entrez: 353498
- Orthologs: NCBI: entry; OMA: entry
- RefSeq (mRNA): NM_181824.1
- RefSeq (Prot): NP_861545.1
- UniProt: P30100

Other data
- EC number: 1.14.15.4
- Chromosome: 7: 116.16 - 116.26 Mb
Search for
- Structures: Swiss-model
- Domains: InterPro

The Cyp11b3 is a rat gene encoding a CYP450 enzyme, which is mainly expressed in neonatal rat adrenals, and also expressed in a small amount in other organs of adult rats, this enzyme mainly catalyzing 11-Deoxycorticosterone (DOC) to 18-Hydroxy-11-deoxycorticosterone (18-OH-DOC). Cyp11b3 gene is also located at Chromosome 7q34, next to rat CYP11B1 and CYP11B2.
