= Fluclorolone =

Chemical compound

Clinical data
- Other names: 6α-Fluoro-9α,11β-dichloro-16α,17α,21-trihydroxypregna-1,4-diene-3,20-dione
- Drug class: Corticosteroid; Glucocorticoid

Identifiers
- IUPAC name: (6S,8S,9R,10S,11S,13S,14S,16R,17S)-9,11-Dichloro-6-fluoro-16,17-dihydroxy-17-(2-hydroxyacetyl)-10,13-dimethyl-6,7,8,11,12,14,15,16-octahydrocyclopenta[a]phenanthren-3-one
- CAS Number: 3693-38-7
- PubChem CID: 76962649
- ChemSpider: 32697416
- UNII: 036B9W83KK
- ChEBI: CHEBI:135986
- ChEMBL: ChEMBL3707231
- CompTox Dashboard (EPA): DTXSID601317985

Chemical and physical data
- Formula: C_{21}H_{25}Cl_{2}FO_{5}
- Molar mass: 447.32 g·mol^{−1}
- 3D model (JSmol): Interactive image
- SMILES: C[C@]12C[C@@H]([C@]3([C@H]([C@@H]1C[C@H]([C@@]2(C(=O)CO)O)O)C[C@@H](C4=CC(=O)C=C[C@@]43C)F)Cl)Cl
- InChI: InChI=1S/C21H25Cl2FO5/c1-18-4-3-10(26)5-13(18)14(24)6-12-11-7-16(27)21(29,17(28)9-25)19(11,2)8-15(22)20(12,18)23/h3-5,11-12,14-16,25,27,29H,6-9H2,1-2H3/t11-,12-,14-,15-,16+,18-,19-,20-,21-/m0/s1; Key:VTWKPILBIUBMDS-OTJLYDAYSA-N

Fluclorolone is a synthetic glucocorticoid corticosteroid which was never marketed. The acetonide cyclic ketal of fluclorolone, fluclorolone acetonide, in contrast, has been marketed.
