= Difluprednate =

Corticosteroid drug

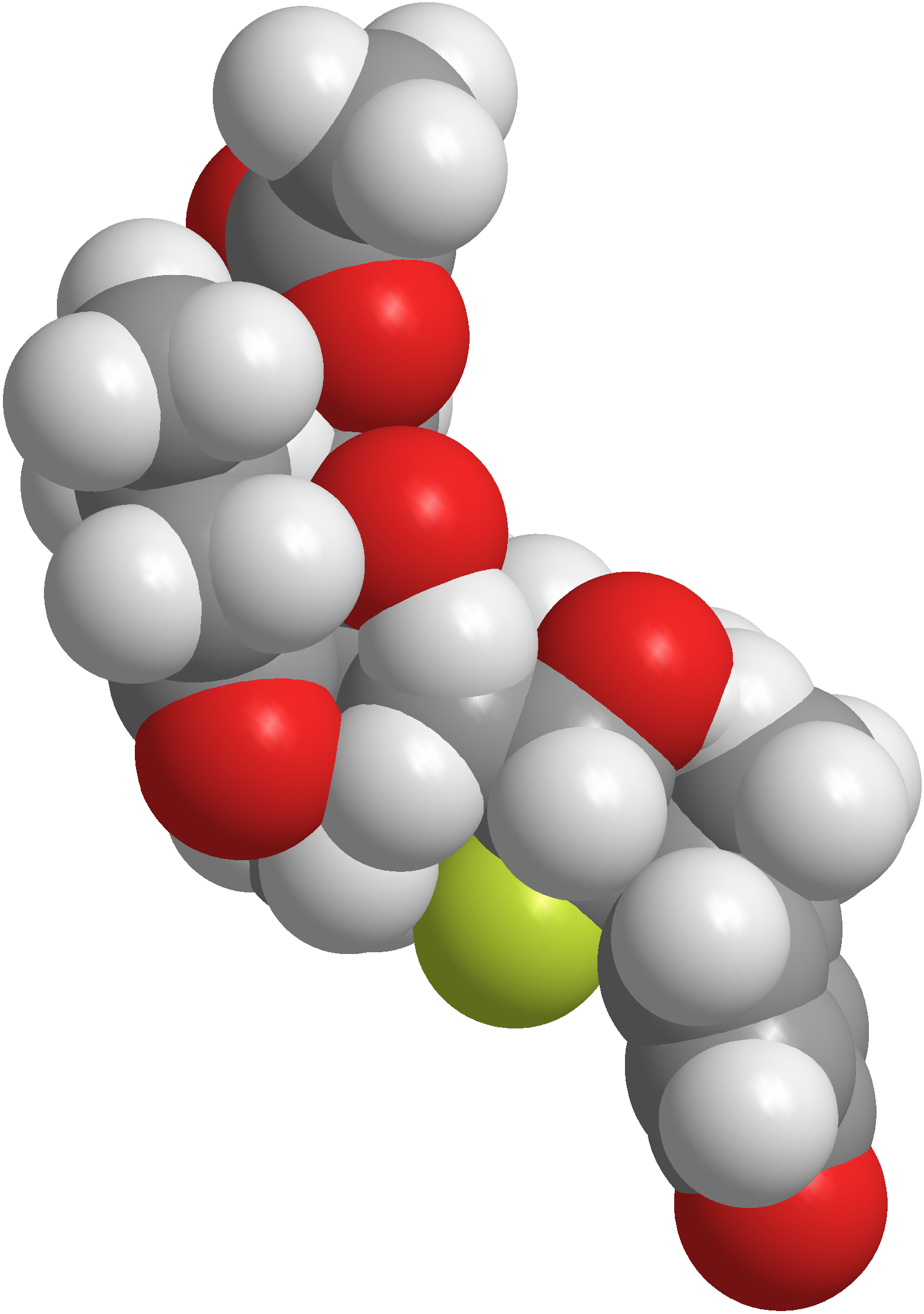

Clinical data
- Trade names: Durezol
- AHFS/Drugs.com: Monograph
- MedlinePlus: a609025
- License data: US FDA: Difluprednate
- Routes of administration: Eye drops
- ATC code: D07AC19 (WHO) S01BA16 (WHO)

Legal status
- Legal status: US: ℞-only

Identifiers
- IUPAC name: [(6S,8S,9R,10S,11S,13S,14S,17R)-17-(2-acetyloxyacetyl)-6,9-difluoro-11-hydroxy-10,13-dimethyl-3-oxo-6,7,8,11,12,14,15,16-octahydrocyclopenta[a]phenanthren-17-yl] butanoate
- CAS Number: 23674-86-4
- PubChem CID: 32037
- DrugBank: DB06781
- ChemSpider: 391990
- UNII: S8A06QG2QE
- KEGG: D01266
- ChEBI: CHEBI:31485
- ChEMBL: ChEMBL1201749
- CompTox Dashboard (EPA): DTXSID0046773
- ECHA InfoCard: 100.041.636

Chemical and physical data
- Formula: C_{27}H_{34}F_{2}O_{7}
- Molar mass: 508.559 g·mol^{−1}
- 3D model (JSmol): Interactive image
- SMILES: [H][C@@]12CC[C@](OC(=O)CCC)(C(=O)COC(C)=O)[C@@]1(C)C[C@H](O)[C@@]1(F)[C@@]2([H])C[C@H](F)C2=CC(=O)C=C[C@]12C
- InChI: InChI=1S/C27H34F2O7/c1-5-6-23(34)36-26(22(33)14-35-15(2)30)10-8-17-18-12-20(28)19-11-16(31)7-9-24(19,3)27(18,29)21(32)13-25(17,26)4/h7,9,11,17-18,20-21,32H,5-6,8,10,12-14H2,1-4H3/t17-,18-,20-,21-,24-,25-,26-,27-/m0/s1; Key:WYQPLTPSGFELIB-JTQPXKBDSA-N

Difluprednate, sold under the brand name Durezol, is a corticosteroid used for the treatment of post-operative ocular inflammation and pain.

It was approved for medical use in the United States in June 2008. It is available as a generic medication.

== Medical uses ==
Difluprednate is indicated for the treatment of inflammation and pain associated with ocular surgery; and the treatment of endogenous anterior uveitis.

== Clinical trials ==
Difluprednate ophthalmic emulsion 0.05% is also being studied in other ocular inflammatory diseases, including a phase 3 study evaluating difluprednate for the treatment of anterior uveitis
