= Cortisone acetate =

Chemical compound

- Skeletal formula of cortisone acetate

- Ball-and-stick model of cortisone acetate

Clinical data
- Trade names: Adreson, Cortison, Cortisone, Cortisone Acetate, Cortone, Cortistab, Cortisyl, others
- Other names: Cortisone 21-acetate; 17α,21-Dihydroxypregn-4-ene-3,11,20-trione 21-acetate
- Drug class: Corticosteroid; Glucocorticoid

Identifiers
- IUPAC name: [2-[(8S,9S,10R,13S,14S,17R)-17-hydroxy-10,13-dimethyl-3,11-dioxo-1,2,6,7,8,9,12,14,15,16-decahydrocyclopenta[a]phenanthren-17-yl]-2-oxoethyl] acetate
- CAS Number: 50-04-4
- PubChem CID: 5745
- DrugBank: DB01380
- ChemSpider: 5543
- UNII: 883WKN7W8X
- KEGG: D00973
- ChEBI: CHEBI:3897
- ChEMBL: ChEMBL1650
- CompTox Dashboard (EPA): DTXSID0022858
- ECHA InfoCard: 100.000.006

Chemical and physical data
- Formula: C_{23}H_{30}O_{6}
- Molar mass: 402.487 g·mol^{−1}
- 3D model (JSmol): Interactive image
- SMILES: CC(=O)OCC(=O)[C@]1(CC[C@@H]2[C@@]1(CC(=O)[C@H]3[C@H]2CCC4=CC(=O)CC[C@]34C)C)O
- InChI: InChI=1S/C23H30O6/c1-13(24)29-12-19(27)23(28)9-7-17-16-5-4-14-10-15(25)6-8-21(14,2)20(16)18(26)11-22(17,23)3/h10,16-17,20,28H,4-9,11-12H2,1-3H3/t16-,17-,20+,21-,22-,23-/m0/s1; Key:ITRJWOMZKQRYTA-RFZYENFJSA-N

Cortisone acetate (brand names Adreson, Cortison, Cortisone, Cortisone Acetate, Cortone, Cortistab, Cortisyl, others) is a synthetic glucocorticoid corticosteroid and corticosteroid ester which is marketed (under prescription) in many countries throughout the world, including in the United States, the United Kingdom, and various other European countries. It is the C21 acetate ester of cortisone, and acts as a prodrug of cortisone in the body.
