= Fluclorolone acetonide =

Chemical compound

Clinical data
- Trade names: Cutanit, Topicon
- Routes of administration: Topical
- ATC code: D07AC02 (WHO)

Identifiers
- CAS Number: 3693-39-8
- PubChem CID: 20054914
- DrugBank: DB08973
- ChemSpider: 16735814
- UNII: MG258KTA37
- ChEMBL: ChEMBL461332
- CompTox Dashboard (EPA): DTXSID001043281
- ECHA InfoCard: 100.020.919

Chemical and physical data
- Formula: C_{24}H_{29}Cl_{2}FO_{5}
- Molar mass: 487.39 g·mol^{−1}

Fluclorolone acetonide (INN, or flucloronide, USAN, trade names Cutanit, Topicon) is a corticosteroid for topical use on the skin.

Free fluclorolone, without the acetonide (C_{21}H_{25}Cl_{2}FO_{5}, CID 60900 from PubChem)
