= Hydrocortisone aceponate =

Chemical compound

Clinical data
- Trade names: Cortavance, others
- AHFS/Drugs.com: Monograph
- Routes of administration: Topical
- Drug class: Corticosteroid
- ATC code: D07AC16 (WHO)

Legal status
- Legal status: EU: Rx-only

Pharmacokinetic data
- Metabolism: Liver
- Elimination half-life: 6-8 hours

Identifiers
- IUPAC name: (11β)-21-(acetyloxy)-11-hydroxy-3,20-dioxopregn-4-en-17-yl propionate
- CAS Number: 74050-20-7
- PubChem CID: 68921
- DrugBank: DB14538
- ChemSpider: 62148
- UNII: 2340UP1L2G
- KEGG: D06876
- ChEBI: CHEBI:135746
- ChEMBL: ChEMBL2106309
- ECHA InfoCard: 100.184.885

Chemical and physical data
- Formula: C_{26}H_{36}O_{7}
- Molar mass: 460.567 g·mol^{−1}
- 3D model (JSmol): Interactive image
- SMILES: CCC(=O)O[C@@]1(CC[C@@H]2[C@@]1(C[C@@H]([C@H]3[C@H]2CCC4=CC(=O)CC[C@]34C)O)C)C(=O)COC(=O)C
- InChI: InChI=1S/C26H36O7/c1-5-22(31)33-26(21(30)14-32-15(2)27)11-9-19-18-7-6-16-12-17(28)8-10-24(16,3)23(18)20(29)13-25(19,26)4/h12,18-20,23,29H,5-11,13-14H2,1-4H3/t18-,19-,20-,23+,24-,25-,26-/m0/s1; Key:MFBMYAOAMQLLPK-FZNHGJLXSA-N

Hydrocortisone aceponate is a veterinary corticosteroid that is used in form of creams for the treatment of various dermatoses (skin conditions). It is an ester of hydrocortisone (cortisol) with acetic acid and propionic acid.

== Medical uses ==
Hydrocortisone aceponate is typically used for skin conditions in veterinary practices for dogs. In this instance, it can be used on acute otitis externa, a bacterial infection causing inflammation of the ear canal, as well as a treatment for itchy skin caused by allergies. Additionally, hydrocortisone aceponate can be used to treat hormonal disorders and immune and allergic disorders. The main use for hydrocortisone aceponate is for atopic skin conditions and acute ear infections. It is shown to help with skin lesions and inflammation that respond to corticosteroids but may have been resistant to other treatments. It has been approved for veterinary use in the European Union.

=== Adverse effects ===
Side effects include:

- Inhibition of bone formation
- Suppression of calcium absorption
- Delayed wound healing
- Redness on skin

== Chemistry ==
Hydrocortisone aceponate is a steroid which takes the form of a diester. The diester increases transmission of the medicine through the skin and also increases the time that it remains in the affected area.

== Society and culture ==
=== Brand names ===
Cortavance is the brand name for a veterinary medication used to treat inflamed, itchy skin, typically caused by allergies.

Easotic is the brand name for a veterinary combination medication used to treat acute ear infections in dogs. It is composed of three active substances: hydrocortisone aceponate, miconazole nitrate and gentamicin. These are used in conjunction with hydrocortisone aceponate acts as an anti-inflammatory agent, miconazole nitrate has antifungal properties, and gentamicin is an antibiotic. The medication is used through ear drops and works to kill the foreign agent, prevent further spread, and mitigate symptoms.
