= Doxibetasol =

Synthetic glucocorticoid corticosteroid

Clinical data
- Other names: Doxybetasol; Deoxydexamethasone; 21-Deoxydexamethasone; GR 2/443; 9α-Fluoro-11β,17α-dihydroxy-16β-methylpregna-1,4-diene-3,20-dione
- Drug class: Corticosteroid; Glucocorticoid

Identifiers
- IUPAC name: (8S,9R,10S,11S,13S,14S,16S,17R)-17-Acetyl-9-fluoro-11,17-dihydroxy-10,13,16-trimethyl-6,7,8,11,12,14,15,16-octahydrocyclopenta[a]phenanthren-3-one
- CAS Number: 1879-77-2
- PubChem CID: 71106
- ChemSpider: 64259
- UNII: 0JS043FG0D
- ChEMBL: ChEMBL3989430
- CompTox Dashboard (EPA): DTXSID401043190
- ECHA InfoCard: 100.015.942

Chemical and physical data
- Formula: C_{22}H_{29}FO_{4}
- Molar mass: 376.468 g·mol^{−1}
- 3D model (JSmol): Interactive image
- SMILES: C[C@H]1C[C@H]2[C@@H]3CCC4=CC(=O)C=C[C@@]4([C@]3([C@H](C[C@@]2([C@]1(C(=O)C)O)C)O)F)C
- InChI: InChI=1S/C22H29FO4/c1-12-9-17-16-6-5-14-10-15(25)7-8-19(14,3)21(16,23)18(26)11-20(17,4)22(12,27)13(2)24/h7-8,10,12,16-18,26-27H,5-6,9,11H2,1-4H3/t12-,16-,17-,18-,19-,20-,21-,22-/m0/s1; Key:IKGBPSZWCRRUQS-DTAAKRQUSA-N

Doxibetasol (doxybetasol; developmental code name GR 2/443) is a synthetic glucocorticoid corticosteroid.
