= Hydrocortisone buteprate =

Chemical compound

Clinical data
- Trade names: Pandel
- Other names: Hydrocortisone probutate; Hydrocortisone 17α-butyrate 21-propionate; Hydrocortisone butyrate propionate, hydrocortisone probutate (USAN US)
- AHFS/Drugs.com: Monograph
- Pregnancy category: AU: A
- Routes of administration: Topical
- ATC code: D07AB11 (WHO)

Legal status
- Legal status: US: OTC

Identifiers
- IUPAC name: (11β)-11-hydroxy-3,20-dioxo-21-(propionyloxy)pregn-4-en-17-yl butyrate
- CAS Number: 72590-77-3
- PubChem CID: 636398
- DrugBank: DB14543
- ChemSpider: 552186
- UNII: O6550D6K3A
- KEGG: D01886; C13358
- ChEBI: CHEBI:31675
- ChEMBL: ChEMBL200953
- CompTox Dashboard (EPA): DTXSID3048603
- ECHA InfoCard: 100.069.730

Chemical and physical data
- Formula: C_{28}H_{40}O_{7}
- Molar mass: 488.621 g·mol^{−1}
- 3D model (JSmol): Interactive image
- SMILES: CCCC(=O)O[C@@]1(CC[C@@H]2[C@@]1(C[C@@H]([C@H]3[C@H]2CCC4=CC(=O)CC[C@]34C)O)C)C(=O)COC(=O)CC
- InChI: InChI=1S/C28H40O7/c1-5-7-24(33)35-28(22(31)16-34-23(32)6-2)13-11-20-19-9-8-17-14-18(29)10-12-26(17,3)25(19)21(30)15-27(20,28)4/h14,19-21,25,30H,5-13,15-16H2,1-4H3/t19-,20-,21-,25+,26-,27-,28-/m0/s1; Key:FOGXJPFPZOHSQS-AYVLZSQQSA-N

Hydrocortisone buteprate, also known as hydrocortisone probutate and as hydrocortisone butyrate propionate, is a topical corticosteroid. It is an ester of hydrocortisone (cortisol) with butyric acid and propionic acid.
