= Fluocinolone =

Synthetic glucocorticoid corticosteroid

Clinical data
- Other names: 6α-Fluorotriamcinolone; 6α,9α-Difluoro-11β,16α,17α,21-tetrahydroxypregna-1,4-diene-3,20-dione
- Drug class: Corticosteroid; Glucocorticoid

Identifiers
- IUPAC name: (6S,8S,9R,10S,11S,13S,14S,16R,17S)-6,9-Difluoro-11,16,17-trihydroxy-17-(2-hydroxyacetyl)-10,13-dimethyl-6,7,8,11,12,14,15,16-octahydrocyclopenta[a]phenanthren-3-one
- CAS Number: 807-38-5
- PubChem CID: 91488
- ChemSpider: 82611
- UNII: CT1IX58L9S
- CompTox Dashboard (EPA): DTXSID001016494
- ECHA InfoCard: 100.011.239

Chemical and physical data
- Formula: C_{21}H_{26}F_{2}O_{6}
- Molar mass: 412.430 g·mol^{−1}
- 3D model (JSmol): Interactive image
- SMILES: C[C@]12C[C@@H]([C@]3([C@H]([C@@H]1C[C@H]([C@@]2(C(=O)CO)O)O)C[C@@H](C4=CC(=O)C=C[C@@]43C)F)F)O
- InChI: InChI=1S/C21H26F2O6/c1-18-4-3-10(25)5-13(18)14(22)6-12-11-7-15(26)21(29,17(28)9-24)19(11,2)8-16(27)20(12,18)23/h3-5,11-12,14-16,24,26-27,29H,6-9H2,1-2H3/t11-,12-,14-,15+,16-,18-,19-,20-,21-/m0/s1; Key:UUOUOERPONYGOS-CLCRDYEYSA-N

Fluocinolone is a synthetic glucocorticoid corticosteroid which was never marketed. The acetonide cyclic ketal of fluocinolone, fluocinolone acetonide, in contrast, has been marketed.
