= 18-Hydroxy-11-deoxycorticosterone =

Names
- IUPAC name 18,21-Dihydroxypregn-4-ene-3,20-dione
- Systematic IUPAC name (1S,3aS,3bR,9aR,9bS,11aR)-1-(Hydroxyacetyl)-11a-(hydroxymethyl)-9a-methyl-1,2,3,3a,3b,4,5,8,9,9a,9b,10,11,11a-tetradecahydro-7H-cyclopenta[a]phenanthren-7-one
- Other names 18,21-dihydroxy-4-pregnene-3,20-dione

Identifiers
CAS Number	379-68-0
3D model (JSmol)	Interactive image
ChemSpider	58495
EC Number	206-834-3
MeSH	18-hydroxydeoxycorticosterone
PubChem CID	64970
CompTox Dashboard (EPA)	DTXSID90958920
- InChI: InChI=1S/C21H30O4/c1-20-8-6-14(24)10-13(20)2-3-15-16(20)7-9-21(12-23)17(15)4-5-18(21)19(25)11-22/h10,15-18,22-23H,2-9,11-12H2,1H3/t15-,16+,17+,18-,20+,21-/m1/s1 Key: VPJHREHKRNIYDB-TZGXILGRSA-N
- SMILES: C[C@]12CCC(=O)C=C1CC[C@@H]3[C@@H]2CC[C@]4([C@H]3CC[C@@H]4C(=O)CO)CO

Properties
Chemical formula	C_{21}H_{30}O_{4}
Molar mass	346.5
- Except where otherwise noted, data are given for materials in their standard state (at 25 °C [77 °F], 100 kPa). Infobox references

18-Hydroxy-11-deoxycorticosterone (also known as 18-OH-DOC, 18,21-dihydroxyprogesterone, and 18,21-dihydroxypregn-4-ene-3,20-dione) is an endogenous steroid and a mineralocorticoid. It is a hydroxylated metabolite of 11-deoxycorticosterone.

In rats, conversion of 11-deoxycorticosterone into 18-OH-DOC is catalyzed by the CYP11B3 enzyme.

In humans, 18-OH-DOC is a weak mineralocorticoid. It may be increased in 17α-hydroxylase (CYP17A1) deficiency, in aldosterone synthase (CYP11B2) deficiency, in primary aldosteronism, and may also indicate a histologic variant of the aldosteronoma. Excessive secretion of 18-OH-DOC can cause mineralocorticoid excess syndrome, although these cases are very rare.
