= Clobetasol =

Chemical compound

Clinical data
- Other names: 9α-Fluoro-11β,17α-dihydroxy-16β-methyl-21-chloropregna-1,4-diene-3,20-dione
- Pregnancy category: AU: B3
- Drug class: Corticosteroid; Glucocorticoid
- ATC code: S01BA17 (WHO)

Identifiers
- IUPAC name: (8S,9R,10S,11S,13S,14S,16S,17R)-17-(2-Chloroacetyl)-9-fluoro-11,17-dihydroxy-10,13,16-trimethyl-6,7,8,11,12,14,15,16-octahydrocyclopenta[a]phenanthren-3-one
- CAS Number: 25122-41-2
- PubChem CID: 5311051
- ChemSpider: 4470588
- UNII: ADN79D536H
- CompTox Dashboard (EPA): DTXSID2048955
- ECHA InfoCard: 100.042.379

Chemical and physical data
- Formula: C_{22}H_{28}ClFO_{4}
- Molar mass: 410.91 g·mol^{−1}
- 3D model (JSmol): Interactive image
- SMILES: C[C@H]1C[C@H]2[C@@H]3CCC4=CC(=O)C=C[C@@]4([C@]3([C@H](C[C@@]2([C@]1(C(=O)CCl)O)C)O)F)C
- InChI: InChI=1S/C22H28ClFO4/c1-12-8-16-15-5-4-13-9-14(25)6-7-19(13,2)21(15,24)17(26)10-20(16,3)22(12,28)18(27)11-23/h6-7,9,12,15-17,26,28H,4-5,8,10-11H2,1-3H3/t12-,15-,16-,17-,19-,20-,21-,22-/m0/s1; Key:FCSHDIVRCWTZOX-DVTGEIKXSA-N

Clobetasol is a synthetic glucocorticoid corticosteroid. A propionate ester of clobetasol, clobetasol propionate, has also been marketed, and is far more widely used in comparison.
