= Fluprednidene acetate =

Pharmaceutical drug

Clinical data
- Trade names: Decoderm, others
- Other names: [2-[(9R,17R)-9-Fluoro-11,17-dihydroxy-10,13-dimethyl-16-methylidene-3-oxo-7,8,11,12,14,15-hexahydro-6H-cyclopenta[a]phenanthren-17-yl]-2-oxoethyl] acetate
- AHFS/Drugs.com: International Drug Names
- Routes of administration: Topical (cream)
- ATC code: D07AB07 (WHO) D07XB03 (WHO) (combinations)

Identifiers
- IUPAC name: 2-[(1R,2S,10S,11S,14R,15S,17S)-1-fluoro-14,17-dihydroxy-2,15-dimethyl-13-methylidene-5-oxotetracyclo[8.7.0.0^{2,7}.0^{11,15}]heptadeca-3,6-dien-14-yl]-2-oxoethyl acetate
- CAS Number: 1255-35-2
- PubChem CID: 9980241
- DrugBank: DB08970
- ChemSpider: 8155833
- UNII: GE65DV564S
- KEGG: D07980
- ChEBI: CHEBI:135700
- CompTox Dashboard (EPA): DTXSID0048719
- ECHA InfoCard: 100.013.649

Chemical and physical data
- Formula: C_{24}H_{29}FO_{6}
- Molar mass: 432.488 g·mol^{−1}
- 3D model (JSmol): Interactive image
- SMILES: CC(=O)OCC(=O)[C@]1(C(=C)C[C@@H]2[C@@]1(C[C@@H]([C@]3([C@H]2CCC4=CC(=O)C=C[C@@]43C)F)O)C)O
- InChI: InChI=1S/C24H29FO6/c1-13-9-18-17-6-5-15-10-16(27)7-8-21(15,3)23(17,25)19(28)11-22(18,4)24(13,30)20(29)12-31-14(2)26/h7-8,10,17-19,28,30H,1,5-6,9,11-12H2,2-4H3/t17-,18-,19-,21-,22-,23-,24-/m0/s1; Key:DEFOZIFYUBUHHU-IYQKUMFPSA-N

Fluprednidene acetate (trade name Decoderm among others) is a moderately potent glucocorticoid used in form of a cream to treat skin inflammations such as atopic dermatitis and contact dermatitis.

== Contraindications ==
Similar to other corticoids, fluprednidene acetate is contraindicated in skin conditions that are caused by bacteria, fungi or viruses, including acne, syphilis, tuberculosis, as well as in rosacea and in children under two years of age. Insufficient data are available to judge safety during pregnancy and lactation.

== Side effects ==
Side effects are rare and include typical corticoid reactions such as skin atrophy, telangiectasias, stretch marks, and steroid acne. They mostly occur when large skin areas (more than 10% of body surface) are treated, when treatment is continued over more than two to four weeks, under occlusive therapy or therapy in skin folds. Hypersensitivity reactions have also been described.

== Pharmacology ==
Under open treatment, little substance reaches the circulation, and the body's own blood corticoid (cortisol) levels are not influenced. Under occlusive therapy, cortisol levels can be decreased because of a feedback reaction via the hypothalamic–pituitary–adrenal axis. This reaction is however not clinically significant.
