= Fludroxycortide =

Chemical compound

Clinical data
- Trade names: Cordran, Haelan
- Other names: 6α-Fluoro-16α-hydroxyhydrocortisone 16,17-acetonide; 6α-Fluoro-11β,16α,17α,21-tetrahydroxypregn-4-ene-3,20-dione 16,17-acetonide
- AHFS/Drugs.com: Micromedex Detailed Consumer Information
- Routes of administration: Topical
- ATC code: D07AC07 (WHO)

Legal status
- Legal status: UK: POM (Prescription only)

Identifiers
- IUPAC name: 6-Fluoro-11,21-dihydroxy-16,17-[(l-methylethylidene)bis(oxy)]-(6α,11β,16α)-pregn-4-ene-3,20-dione
- CAS Number: 1524-88-5
- PubChem CID: 15209
- IUPHAR/BPS: 7606
- DrugBank: DB00846
- ChemSpider: 14475
- UNII: 8EUL29XUQT
- KEGG: D00328
- ChEMBL: ChEMBL1201012
- CompTox Dashboard (EPA): DTXSID2047434
- ECHA InfoCard: 100.014.724

Chemical and physical data
- Formula: C_{24}H_{33}FO_{6}
- Molar mass: 436.520 g·mol^{−1}
- 3D model (JSmol): Interactive image
- SMILES: O=C1\C=C5/[C@](C)(CC1)[C@@H]2[C@H]([C@H]3[C@](C[C@@H]2O)([C@@]4(OC(O[C@@H]4C3)(C)C)C(=O)CO)C)C[C@@H]5F
- InChI: InChI=1S/C24H33FO6/c1-21(2)30-19-9-14-13-8-16(25)15-7-12(27)5-6-22(15,3)20(13)17(28)10-23(14,4)24(19,31-21)18(29)11-26/h7,13-14,16-17,19-20,26,28H,5-6,8-11H2,1-4H3/t13-,14-,16-,17-,19+,20+,22-,23-,24+/m0/s1; Key:POPFMWWJOGLOIF-XWCQMRHXSA-N

Fludroxycortide (INN, BAN, JAN), also known as flurandrenolide (USAN) and flurandrenolone, is a synthetic topical corticosteroid and is used as an anti-inflammatory treatment for use on skin irritations. Trade names include Haelan (Typharm, UK) and Cordran (by Watson Pharmaceuticals, US).

Fludroxycortide is available in ointment, cream and as an impregnated tape (Haelan tape, Cordran tape). Licensed indications in the United Kingdom include recalcitrant dermatoses.
