= Icometasone =

Chemical compound

Clinical data
- Other names: Icomethasone; 9α-Chloro-11β,17α,21-trihydroxy-16α-methylpregna-1,4-diene-3,20-dione
- Drug class: Corticosteroid; Glucocorticoid

Identifiers
- IUPAC name: (8S,9R,10S,11S,13S,14S,16R,17R)-9-Chloro-11,17-dihydroxy-17-(2-hydroxyacetyl)-10,13,16-trimethyl-6,7,8,11,12,14,15,16-octahydrocyclopenta[a]phenanthren-3-one
- CAS Number: 4647-20-5
- PubChem CID: 11407187
- ChemSpider: 9582082
- UNII: 2LP8SJ795G
- CompTox Dashboard (EPA): DTXSID40196850

Chemical and physical data
- Formula: C_{22}H_{29}ClO_{5}
- Molar mass: 408.92 g·mol^{−1}
- 3D model (JSmol): Interactive image
- SMILES: C[C@@H]1C[C@H]2[C@@H]3CCC4=CC(=O)C=C[C@@]4([C@]3([C@H](C[C@@]2([C@]1(C(=O)CO)O)C)O)Cl)C
- InChI: InChI=1S/C22H29ClO5/c1-12-8-16-15-5-4-13-9-14(25)6-7-19(13,2)21(15,23)17(26)10-20(16,3)22(12,28)18(27)11-24/h6-7,9,12,15-17,24,26,28H,4-5,8,10-11H2,1-3H3/t12-,15+,16+,17+,19+,20+,21+,22+/m1/s1; Key:NBMKJKDGKREAPL-CXSFZGCWSA-N

Icometasone is a synthetic glucocorticoid corticosteroid which was never marketed.
