= Prednicarbate =

Chemical compound

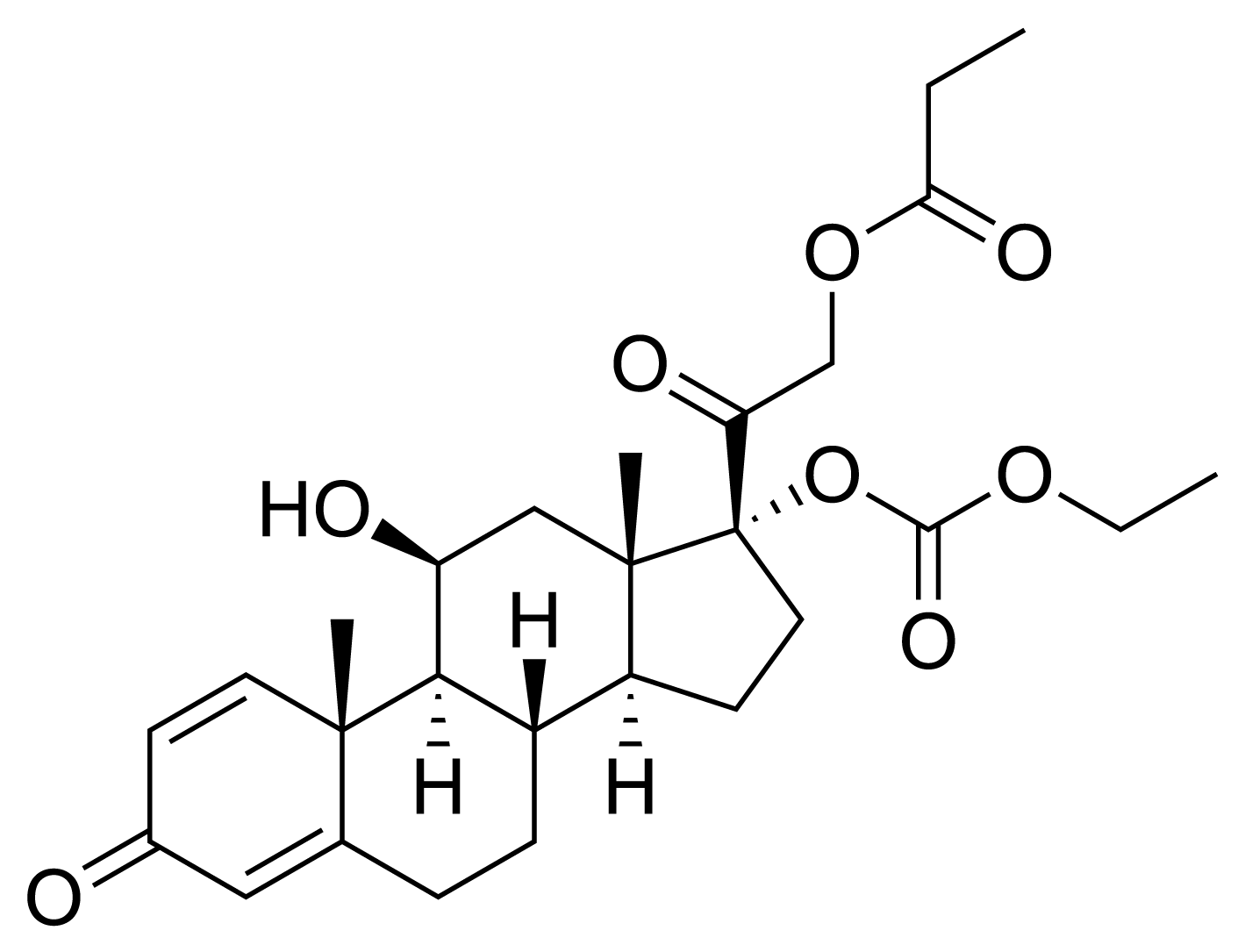

Clinical data
- Other names: {2-[(8S,9S,10R,11S,13S,14S,17R)-17-ethoxycarbonyloxy-11-hydroxy-10,13-dimethyl-3-oxo-7,8,9,11,12,14,15,16-octahydro-6H-cyclopenta[a]phenanthren-17-yl]-2-oxoethyl} propanoate
- AHFS/Drugs.com: Monograph
- MedlinePlus: a604021
- Routes of administration: Topical
- ATC code: D07AC18 (WHO)

Identifiers
- IUPAC name: 17-[(Ethoxycarbonyl)oxy]-11β-hydroxy-3,20-dioxopregna-1,4-dien-21-yl propionate
- CAS Number: 73771-04-7
- PubChem CID: 6714002
- IUPHAR/BPS: 7605
- DrugBank: DB01130
- ChemSpider: 5145991
- UNII: V901LV1K7D
- ChEMBL: ChEMBL1200386
- CompTox Dashboard (EPA): DTXSID9045502
- ECHA InfoCard: 100.070.516

Chemical and physical data
- Formula: C_{27}H_{36}O_{8}
- Molar mass: 488.577 g·mol^{−1}
- 3D model (JSmol): Interactive image
- SMILES: O=C(OCC(=O)[C@@]1(OC(=O)OCC)CC[C@H]2[C@H]4[C@H]([C@@H](O)C[C@]12C)[C@]/3(/C=C\C(=O)\C=C\3CC4)C)CC
- InChI: InChI=1S/C27H36O8/c1-5-22(31)34-15-21(30)27(35-24(32)33-6-2)12-10-19-18-8-7-16-13-17(28)9-11-25(16,3)23(18)20(29)14-26(19,27)4/h9,11,13,18-20,23,29H,5-8,10,12,14-15H2,1-4H3/t18-,19-,20-,23+,25-,26-,27-/m0/s1; Key:FNPXMHRZILFCKX-KAJVQRHHSA-N

Prednicarbate is a relatively new topical corticosteroid drug. It is similar in potency to hydrocortisone. Corticosteroids have always been an important part of the pharmacological arsenal of dermatology; however, their tendency to produce side-effects has caused the need to search for new preparations.

It is nonhalogenated.
