= Fluocortin =

Chemical compound

Clinical data
- Other names: 6α-fluoro-11β,21-dihydroxy-16α-methylpregna-1,4-diene-3,20,21-trione
- ATC code: D07AB04 (WHO)

Pharmacokinetic data
- Bioavailability: 80% i.v.
- Elimination half-life: 1.3 hr.

Identifiers
- IUPAC name: 2-[(6S,8S,9S,10R,11S,13S,14S,16R,17S)-6-Fluoro-11-hydroxy-10,13,16-trimethyl-3-oxo-6,7,8,9,11,12,14,15,16,17-decahydrocyclopenta[a]phenanthren-17-yl]-2-oxoacetic acid
- CAS Number: 33124-50-4
- PubChem CID: 22875828
- ChemSpider: 18865233
- UNII: 03837V0H1Y
- KEGG: D07972
- CompTox Dashboard (EPA): DTXSID30186785
- ECHA InfoCard: 100.046.698

Chemical and physical data
- Formula: C_{22}H_{27}FO_{5}
- Molar mass: 390.451 g·mol^{−1}
- 3D model (JSmol): Interactive image
- SMILES: C[C@@H]1C[C@H]2[C@@H]3C[C@@H](C4=CC(=O)C=C[C@@]4([C@H]3[C@H](C[C@@]2([C@H]1C(=O)C(=O)O)C)O)C)F
- InChI: InChI=1S/C22H27FO5/c1-10-6-13-12-8-15(23)14-7-11(24)4-5-21(14,2)18(12)16(25)9-22(13,3)17(10)19(26)20(27)28/h4-5,7,10,12-13,15-18,25H,6,8-9H2,1-3H3,(H,27,28)/t10-,12+,13+,15+,16+,17-,18-,21+,22+/m1/s1; Key:PUWHHWCHAVXSIG-NCLPIGKXSA-N

Fluocortin is a corticosteroid. It is similar to fluocortolone, but with one more carbonyl group.
