= Halcinonide =

Chemical compound

Clinical data
- Trade names: Halog
- AHFS/Drugs.com: Micromedex Detailed Consumer Information
- MedlinePlus: a682272
- Routes of administration: Topical
- ATC code: D07AD02 (WHO)

Legal status
- Legal status: US: ℞-only

Identifiers
- IUPAC name: (4aS,4bR,5S,6aS,6bS,9aR,10aS,10bS)-6b-(chloroacetyl)-4b-fluoro-5-hydroxy-4a,6a,8,8-tetramethyl-3,4,4a,4b,5,6,6a,6b,9a,10,10a,10b,11,12-tetradecahydro-2H-naphtho[2',1':4,5]indeno[1,2-d][1,3]dioxol-2-one
- CAS Number: 3093-35-4
- PubChem CID: 443943
- DrugBank: DB06786
- ChemSpider: 391997
- UNII: SI86V6QNEG
- ChEMBL: ChEMBL1200845
- CompTox Dashboard (EPA): DTXSID6045375
- ECHA InfoCard: 100.019.490

Chemical and physical data
- Formula: C_{24}H_{32}ClFO_{5}
- Molar mass: 454.96 g·mol^{−1}
- 3D model (JSmol): Interactive image
- SMILES: ClCC(=O)[C@]45OC(O[C@@H]5C[C@@H]2[C@@]4(C[C@H](O)[C@]3(F)[C@@]1(/C(=C\C(=O)CC1)CC[C@@H]23)C)C)(C)C
- InChI: InChI=1S/C24H32ClFO5/c1-20(2)30-19-10-16-15-6-5-13-9-14(27)7-8-21(13,3)23(15,26)17(28)11-22(16,4)24(19,31-20)18(29)12-25/h9,15-17,19,28H,5-8,10-12H2,1-4H3/t15-,16-,17-,19+,21-,22-,23-,24+/m0/s1; Key:MUQNGPZZQDCDFT-JNQJZLCISA-N

Halcinonide is a high potency corticosteroid, in group II (second most potent group) under US classification. It is used topically (in a 0.05% cream provided as Halog) in the treatment of certain skin conditions. It is available as a generic medication.
