= Desoximetasone =

Chemical compound

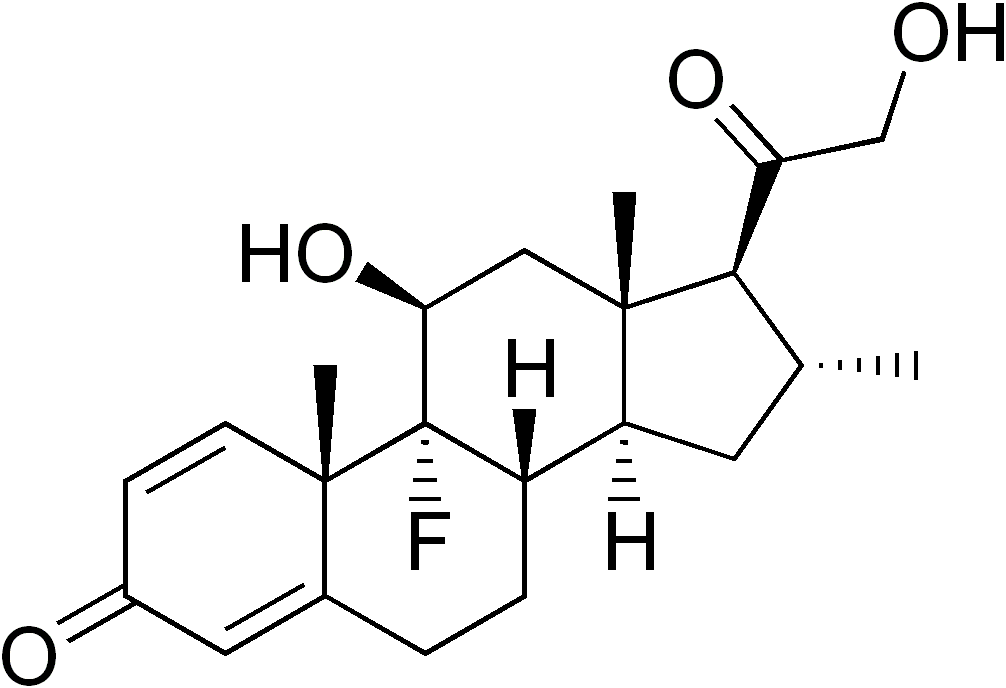

Clinical data
- Trade names: Topicort, Emcor, Desacort
- AHFS/Drugs.com: Monograph
- MedlinePlus: a605026
- Routes of administration: Topical
- ATC code: D07AC03 (WHO) D07XC02 (WHO) (combinations)

Legal status
- Legal status: In general: ℞ (Prescription only)

Identifiers
- IUPAC name: (8S,9S,10S,11S,13S,14S,16R,17S)-9-Fluoro-11- hydroxy-17-(2-hydroxyacetyl)-10,13,16-trimethyl- 7,8,11,12,14,15,16,17-octahydro-6H- cyclopenta[a]phenanthren-3-one
- CAS Number: 382-67-2
- PubChem CID: 5311067
- IUPHAR/BPS: 7067
- DrugBank: DB00547
- ChemSpider: 21117768
- UNII: 4E07GXB7AU
- KEGG: D03697
- ChEMBL: ChEMBL1766
- CompTox Dashboard (EPA): DTXSID3045647
- ECHA InfoCard: 100.006.224

Chemical and physical data
- Formula: C_{22}H_{29}FO_{4}
- Molar mass: 376.468 g·mol^{−1}
- 3D model (JSmol): Interactive image
- SMILES: OCC(=O)[C@H]3[C@H](C)CC2C4CC/C1=C/C(=O)\C=C/[C@]1(C)[C@@]4(F)[C@@H](O)C[C@@]23C
- InChI: InChI=1S/C22H29FO4/c1-12-8-16-15-5-4-13-9-14(25)6-7-21(13,3)22(15,23)18(27)10-20(16,2)19(12)17(26)11-24/h6-7,9,12,15-16,18-19,24,27H,4-5,8,10-11H2,1-3H3/t12-,15?,16?,18+,19-,20+,21+,22+/m1/s1; Key:VWVSBHGCDBMOOT-ZIKVJHDZSA-N

Desoximetasone is a medication belonging to the family of medications known as topical corticosteroids. It is used for the relief of various skin conditions, including rashes. It helps to reduce redness, itching, and irritation. Desoximetasone is a synthetic corticosteroid, a class of primarily synthetic steroids used as anti-inflammatory and anti-pruritic agents.

Three brand name products are available (availability depending on country):

- Topicort Emollient Cream (0.25% desoximetasone)
- Topicort LP Emollient Cream (0.05% desoximetasone)
- Topisolone Cream (0.25% desoximetasone)

== Usage ==
When using desoximetasone, some of the medication may be absorbed through the skin and into the bloodstream. Too much absorption can lead to unwanted side effects elsewhere in the body. Large amounts of desoximetasone should be avoided over large areas. It should not be used for extended periods of time. Treated areas should not be covered with airtight dressings such as plastic wrap or adhesive bandages. Children may absorb more medication than adults do. Desoximetasone is for use only on the skin and should be kept out of the eyes.

Desoximetasone can also be used to treat some types of psoriasis.

== See also ==
- Clobetasol propionate
- Dexamethasone
