= Fluprednidene =

Chemical compound

Clinical data
- Other names: Fluprednylidene; 9α-Fluoro-11β,17α,21-trihydroxy-16-methylenepregna-1,4-diene-3,20-dione
- Drug class: Corticosteroid; Glucocorticoid

Identifiers
- IUPAC name: (8S,9R,10S,11S,13S,14S,17R)-9-Fluoro-11,17-dihydroxy-17-(2-hydroxyacetyl)-10,13-dimethyl-16-methylidene-7,8,11,12,14,15-hexahydro-6H-cyclopenta[a]phenanthren-3-one
- CAS Number: 2193-87-5
- PubChem CID: 11794741
- ChemSpider: 9969413
- UNII: FA517NS3N7
- CompTox Dashboard (EPA): DTXSID30176343
- ECHA InfoCard: 100.016.901

Chemical and physical data
- Formula: C_{22}H_{27}FO_{5}
- Molar mass: 390.451 g·mol^{−1}
- 3D model (JSmol): Interactive image
- SMILES: C[C@]12C[C@@H]([C@]3([C@H]([C@@H]1CC(=C)[C@@]2(C(=O)CO)O)CCC4=CC(=O)C=C[C@@]43C)F)O
- InChI: InChI=1S/C22H27FO5/c1-12-8-16-15-5-4-13-9-14(25)6-7-19(13,2)21(15,23)17(26)10-20(16,3)22(12,28)18(27)11-24/h6-7,9,15-17,24,26,28H,1,4-5,8,10-11H2,2-3H3/t15-,16-,17-,19-,20-,21-,22-/m0/s1; Key:YVHXHNGGPURVOS-SBTDHBFYSA-N

Fluprednidene, also known as fluprednylidene, is a synthetic glucocorticoid corticosteroid which was never marketed. An acetate ester of fluprednidene, fluprednidene acetate, in contrast, has been marketed.
