= Alclometasone =

Chemical compound

Clinical data
- Trade names: Aclovate
- AHFS/Drugs.com: Monograph
- MedlinePlus: a604021
- Routes of administration: Topical
- ATC code: D07AB10 (WHO) S01BA10 (WHO)

Legal status
- Legal status: US: ℞-only

Pharmacokinetic data
- Bioavailability: 3% systemically (topical)
- Metabolism: Hepatic
- Onset of action: Eczema: 5.3 - 13.9 days; Psoriasis: 6.7 - 14.8 days

Identifiers
- IUPAC name: (7R,8S,9S,10R,11S,13S,14S,16R,17R)-7-Chloro-11,17-dihydroxy-17-(2-hydroxyacetyl)-10,13,16-trimethyl-7,8,9,11,12,14,15,16-octahydro-6H-cyclopenta[a]phenanthren-3-one
- CAS Number: 67452-97-5
- PubChem CID: 5311000
- DrugBank: DB00240
- ChemSpider: 4470541
- UNII: 136H45TB7B
- ChEBI: CHEBI:53776
- ChEMBL: ChEMBL1201361

Chemical and physical data
- Formula: C_{22}H_{29}ClO_{5}
- Molar mass: 408.92 g·mol^{−1}
- 3D model (JSmol): Interactive image
- SMILES: C[C@@H]1C[C@H]2[C@@H]3[C@@H](CC4=CC(=O)C=C[C@@]4([C@H]3[C@H](C[C@@]2([C@]1(C(=O)CO)O)C)O)C)Cl
- InChI: InChI=1S/C22H29ClO5/c1-11-6-14-18-15(23)8-12-7-13(25)4-5-20(12,2)19(18)16(26)9-21(14,3)22(11,28)17(27)10-24/h4-5,7,11,14-16,18-19,24,26,28H,6,8-10H2,1-3H3/t11-,14+,15-,16+,18-,19+,20+,21+,22+/m1/s1; Key:FJXOGVLKCZQRDN-PHCHRAKRSA-N

Alclometasone is a synthetic corticosteroid for topical dermatologic use, possessing anti-inflammatory, antipruritic, and vasoconstrictive properties.

The prodrug alclometasone dipropionate was originally marketed under the brand name Aclovate by GlaxoSmithKline as a topical cream and ointment. However, generic versions of the drug are available.

== Medical uses ==
Alclometasone cream and ointment are indicated for the relief of corticosteroid-responsive dermatoses, including:

- atopic dermatitis
- eczema
- psoriasis
- allergic dermatitis
- contact dermatitis
- actinic dermatitis
- kiss-type allergy
- skin itch

Alclometasone may be used on sensitive skin sites (face, skinfolds); in pediatric patients 1 year or older and in geriatric patients.

== Contraindications ==
- hypersensitivity to alclometasone or any of ingredients in pharmaceutical forms
- cutaneous tuberculosis
- chicken pox
- perioral dermatitis
- acne
- rosacea
- open wounds
- trophic ulcers
- viral infection of skin
- skin manifestations of syphilis

== Side effects ==
Adverse reactions (sometimes, less than 1-2% cases) include:

- burning
- itching
- erythema
- skin reddening
- xerodermia
- skin irritation
- acne
- hypopigmentation
- prickly heat
- folliculitis
- white atrophy
- hypertrichosis
- reinfection of skin

== Pharmacology ==
Alclometasone induces the production of lipocortins, formally known as annexins, which inhibit phospholipase A2 – the enzyme responsible for the synthesis of arachidonic acid. Without the oxidation of arachidonic acid, eicosanoids, such as prostaglandins, thromboxanes, and leukotrienes, can't be produced.

Alclometasone also inhibits the release of pro-inflammatory mediators from leukocytes (e.g., cytokines, histamine, leukotrienes, serotonin).

== Formulations ==
Alclometasone as Aclovate is supplied in:

- Cream; Topical; 0.05%
- Ointment; Topical; 0.05%
