= Prednylidene =

Chemical compound

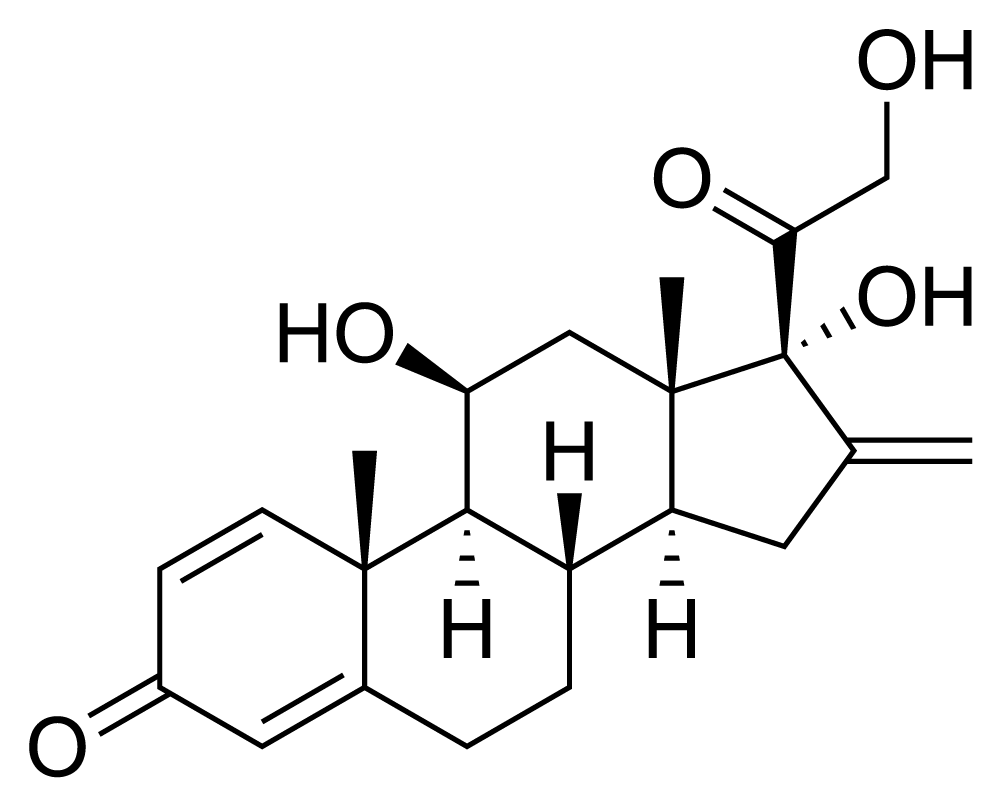

Clinical data
- Other names: (8S,9S,10R,11S,13S,14S,17R)-11,17-dihydroxy-17-(2-hydroxyacetyl)-10,13-dimethyl-16-methylidene-6,7,8,9,11,12,14,15-octahydrocyclopenta[a]phenanthren-3-one
- ATC code: H02AB11 (WHO)

Identifiers
- IUPAC name: (11β)-11,17,21-trihydroxy-16-methylenepregna-1,4-diene-3,20-dione
- CAS Number: 599-33-7
- PubChem CID: 20055008
- DrugBank: DB13208
- ChemSpider: 16735979
- UNII: IF8PQP966U
- CompTox Dashboard (EPA): DTXSID50208610
- ECHA InfoCard: 100.009.060

Chemical and physical data
- Formula: C_{22}H_{28}O_{5}
- Molar mass: 372.461 g·mol^{−1}
- 3D model (JSmol): Interactive image
- SMILES: OCC(=O)[C@@]2(O)C(=C)C[C@H]3[C@@H]4CC\C1=C\C(=O)\C=C/[C@]1(C)[C@H]4[C@@H](O)C[C@]23C
- InChI: InChI=1S/C22H28O5/c1-12-8-16-15-5-4-13-9-14(24)6-7-20(13,2)19(15)17(25)10-21(16,3)22(12,27)18(26)11-23/h6-7,9,15-17,19,23,25,27H,1,4-5,8,10-11H2,2-3H3/t15-,16-,17-,19+,20-,21-,22-/m0/s1; Key:WSVOMANDJDYYEY-CWNVBEKCSA-N

Prednylidene is a glucocorticoid for systemic use.

Substitution at position 16 also leads to more potent corticosteroids. The additional steric bulk introduced by such substituents adjacent to the dihydroxyacetone side chain also protects that moiety against metabolic degradation.
