= Flumetasone =

Chemical compound

Clinical data
- Trade names: Flucort
- Other names: Flumethasone (USAN)
- AHFS/Drugs.com: Micromedex Detailed Consumer Information
- Routes of administration: Topical
- ATC code: D07AB03 (WHO) , D07XB01 (WHO) (combinations), QH02AB90 (WHO)

Legal status
- Legal status: US: ℞-only

Pharmacokinetic data
- Metabolism: Liver, CYP3A4-mediated

Identifiers
- IUPAC name: (1R,2S,8S,10S,11S,13R,14R,15S,17S)-1,8-difluoro-14,17-dihydroxy-14-(2-hydroxyacetyl)-2,13,15-trimethyltetracyclo[8.7.0.0^{2,7}.0^{11,15}]heptadeca-3,6-dien-5-one
- CAS Number: 2135-17-3
- PubChem CID: 16490
- ChemSpider: 15632
- UNII: LR3CD8SX89
- KEGG: D04208
- ChEBI: CHEBI:34764
- ChEMBL: ChEMBL1201392
- CompTox Dashboard (EPA): DTXSID2045365
- ECHA InfoCard: 100.016.701

Chemical and physical data
- Formula: C_{22}H_{28}F_{2}O_{5}
- Molar mass: 410.458 g·mol^{−1}
- 3D model (JSmol): Interactive image
- SMILES: C[C@@H]1C[C@H]2[C@@H]3C[C@@H](C4=CC(=O)C=C[C@@]4([C@]3([C@H](C[C@@]2([C@]1(C(=O)CO)O)C)O)F)C)F
- InChI: InChI=1S/C22H28F2O5/c1-11-6-13-14-8-16(23)15-7-12(26)4-5-19(15,2)21(14,24)17(27)9-20(13,3)22(11,29)18(28)10-25/h4-5,7,11,13-14,16-17,25,27,29H,6,8-10H2,1-3H3/t11-,13+,14+,16+,17+,19+,20+,21+,22+/m1/s1; Key:WXURHACBFYSXBI-GQKYHHCASA-N

Flumetasone, also known as flumethasone, is a corticosteroid for topical use. It has anti-inflammatory, antipruritic, and vasoconstrictive properties, and it is approved for human and animal use for a variety of medical conditions.

It was patented in 1951 and approved for medical use in 1964.

== Chemistry and mechanism of action ==
Flumetasone is classified as a moderately potent corticosteroid and a glucocorticoid receptor agonist. Like other corticosteroids, it functions as an immunosuppressant by decreasing function of the lymphatic system, reducing immunoglobulin and complement concentrations, lowering lymphocyte concentrations, and preventing antigen-antibody binding. Flumethasone is 420 times as potent as cortisone in an animal model for anti-inflammatory activity.

== Society and culture ==
=== Names ===
Trade names include Locacorten, Locorten, and Orsalin. It is available in combination with clioquinol, under the brand name Locacorten-Vioform (in some countries Locorten-Vioform), for the treatment of otitis externa and otomycosis. It is usually formulated as the pivalic acid ester prodrug called flumetasone pivalate.

== Veterinary uses ==
In April 2023, the US Food and Drug Administration approved the first generic version of flumethasone (Bimasone), for certain diseases that cause inflammation in horses, dogs, and cats. Flumetasone is recommended for the various rheumatic, allergic, dermatologic and other disease states that are known to be responsive to anti-inflammatory drugs (i.e., corticoids) in these species.

In horses, flumetasone is approved for use for musculoskeletal conditions due to inflammation, such as bursitis (a painful condition that affects the fluid-filled sacs that cushion the bones, tendons and muscles near a horse's joints, often in the hip or shoulder), carpitis (inflammation of the connective tissues near the horse's carpus, which is comparable to the human wrist), osselets (arthritis in the fetlock joint of a horse, often in the front legs), and myositis (rapid muscle wasting, often in the horse's hindquarters).

In dogs, Bimasone is approved for use for musculoskeletal conditions due to inflammation of muscles or joints, such as arthritis, osteoarthritis, intervertebral disc disease, and myositis. The drug has proven useful in treating canine ear infections (otitis externa) when used with topical medication for similar reasons. It is also approved for certain acute and chronic skin conditions (dermatoses) from various causes to help control the itchy skin (pruritus), irritation, and inflammation associated with these conditions, and for use in treating allergic reactions, such as hives, urticaria (raised itchy rash on skin), and insect bites. Flumetasone is also approved for treating shock in dogs, when administered intravenously.

In cats, flumetasone is approved for certain acute and chronic skin conditions (dermatoses) from various causes to help control the itchy skin (pruritus), irritation, and inflammation associated with these conditions.
