= Halometasone =

Chemical compound

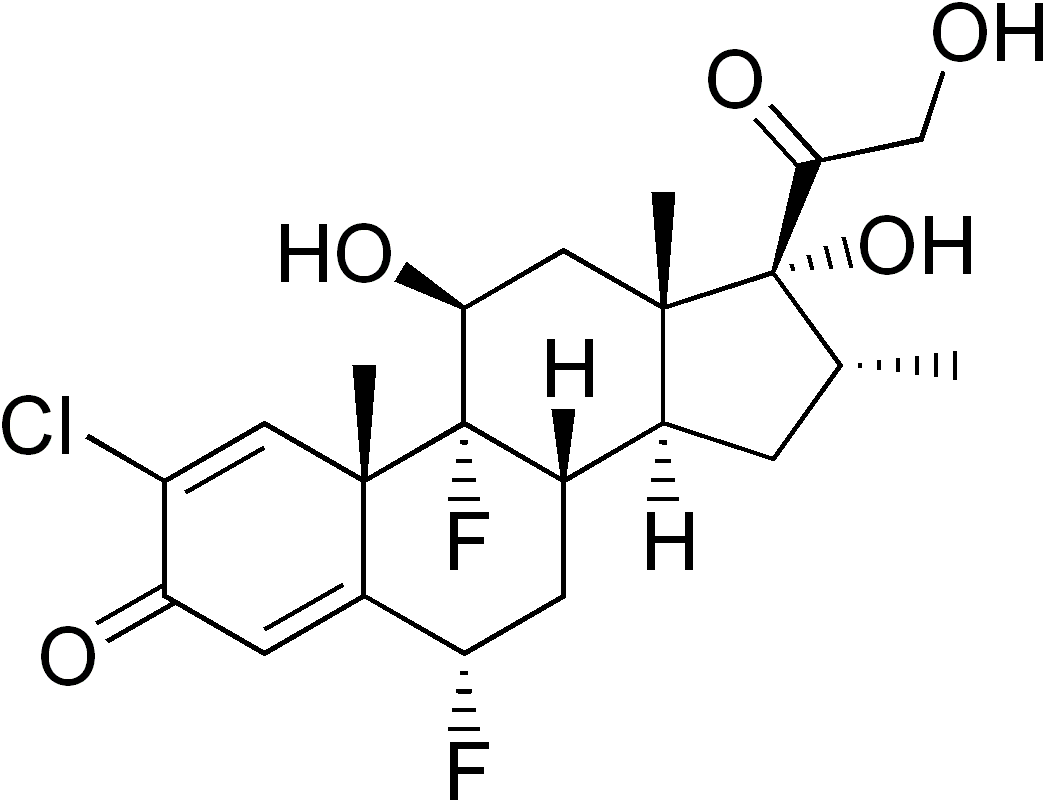

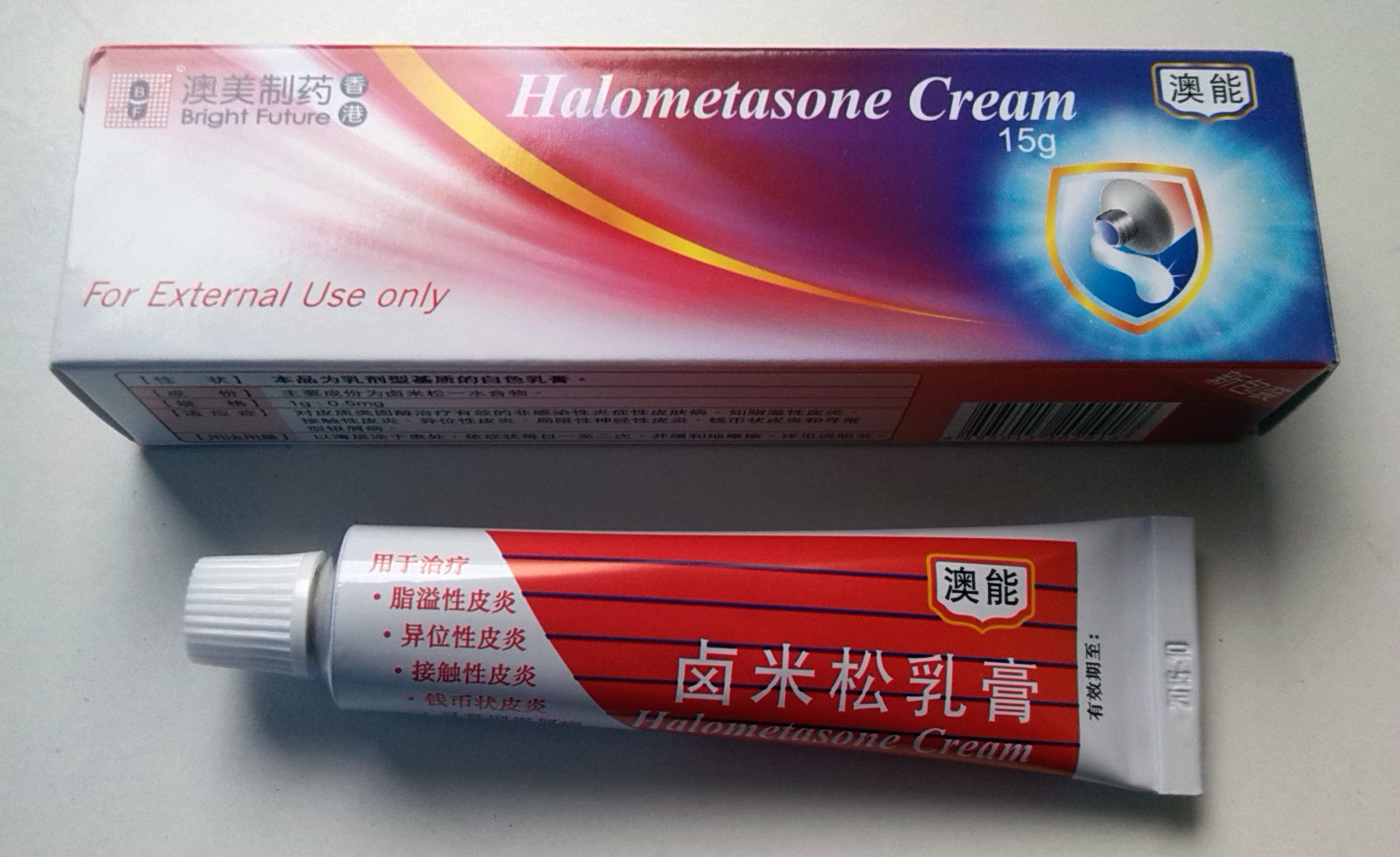

Clinical data
- Trade names: Sicorten
- Other names: (6S,8S,9R,10S,11S,13S,16R,17R)-2-chloro-6,9-difluoro-11,17-dihydroxy-17-(2-hydroxy-acetyl)-10,13,16-trimethyl-6,7,8,11,12,14,15,16-octahydrocyclopenta[a]phenanthren-3-one
- AHFS/Drugs.com: International Drug Names
- Routes of administration: Topical
- ATC code: D07AC12 (WHO)

Identifiers
- IUPAC name: (6α,11β,16α)-2-Chloro-6,9-difluoro-11,17,21-trihydroxy-16-methylpregna-1,4-diene-3,20-dione
- CAS Number: 50629-82-8
- PubChem CID: 9846332
- ChemSpider: 8022046
- UNII: J69Z9UU41Z
- ChEMBL: ChEMBL1587228
- CompTox Dashboard (EPA): DTXSID1048382
- ECHA InfoCard: 100.051.496

Chemical and physical data
- Formula: C_{22}H_{27}ClF_{2}O_{5}
- Molar mass: 444.90 g·mol^{−1}
- 3D model (JSmol): Interactive image
- SMILES: O=C(CO)[C@]3(O)[C@]2(C[C@H](O)[C@]4(F)[C@@]/1(\C(=C/C(=O)C(\Cl)=C\1)[C@@H](F)C[C@H]4[C@@H]2C[C@H]3C)C)C
- InChI: InChI=1S/C22H27ClF2O5/c1-10-4-11-12-5-15(24)13-6-16(27)14(23)7-19(13,2)21(12,25)17(28)8-20(11,3)22(10,30)18(29)9-26/h6-7,10-12,15,17,26,28,30H,4-5,8-9H2,1-3H3/t10-,11+,12+,15+,17+,19+,20+,21+,22+/m1/s1; Key:GGXMRPUKBWXVHE-MIHLVHIWSA-N

Halometasone is a potent (Group III) synthetic tri-halogenated corticosteroid for topical application possessing pronounced anti-inflammatory, antiexudative, antiepidermoplastic, antiallergic, and antipruritic properties. It has been approved in many European countries including Spain, Germany, Switzerland, Austria, Netherlands, Belgium, and Portugal and other regions such as China, Hong Kong, Turkey, Israel, South Africa and India.

It has been used to treat chronic psoriasis vulgaris and non-infected acute eczematous dermatoses (eczema). One study demonstrated that 0.05% halometasone cream was more effective than 0.05% betamethasone cream in treating dermatitis, though both were well tolerated, with no systemic adverse effects reported.
