= Ciclesonide =

Chemical compound

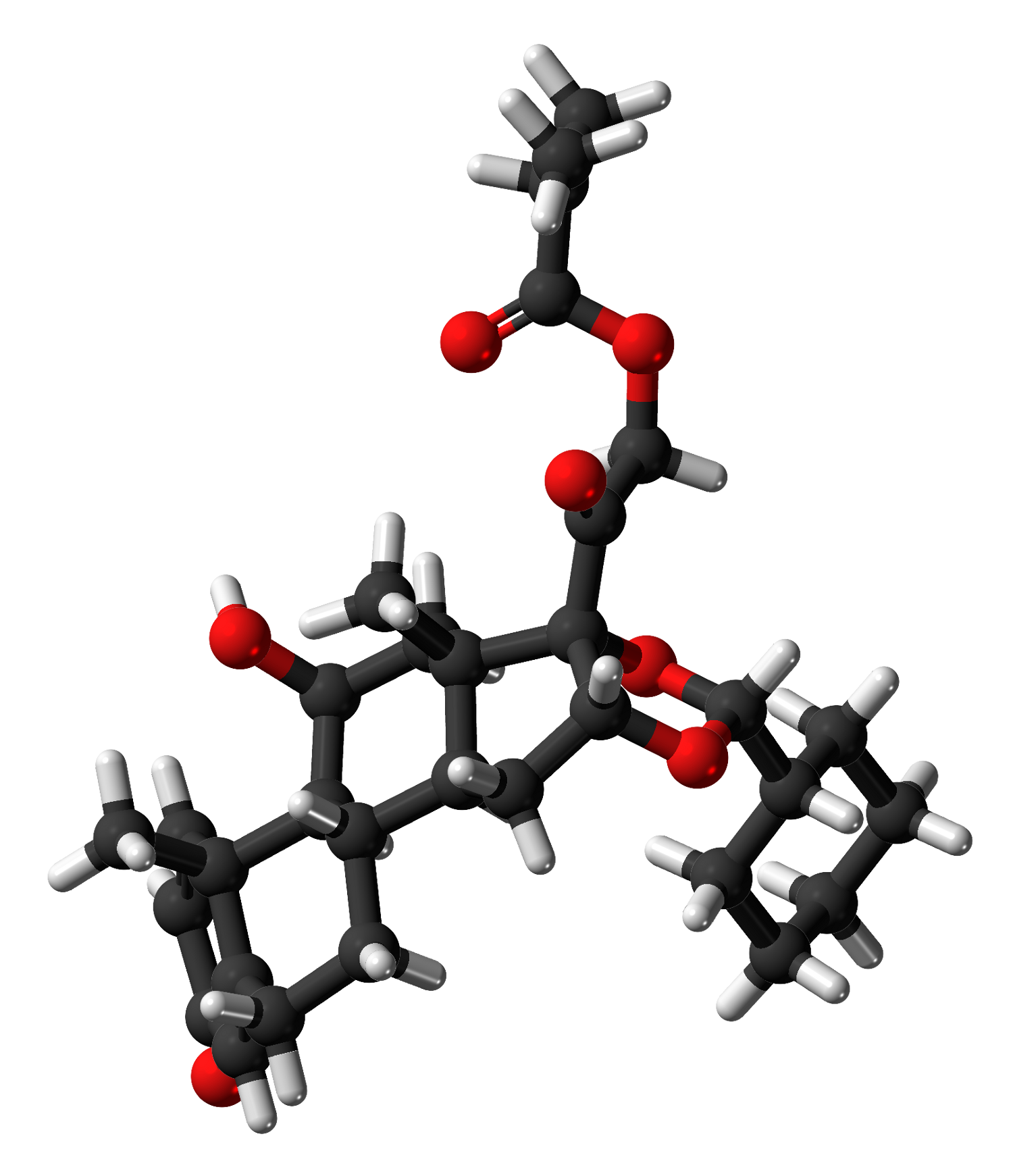

Clinical data
- Trade names: Omnaris, others
- Other names: (11β, 16α)-16, 17-[[(R)-cyclohexylmethylene]bis(oxy)]-11-hydroxy-21- (2-methyl-1-oxopropoxy)- pregna-1, 4-diene-3, 20-dione
- AHFS/Drugs.com: Monograph
- MedlinePlus: a607008
- Pregnancy category: AU: B3
- Routes of administration: Nasal inhalation
- ATC code: R01AD13 (WHO) R03BA08 (WHO)

Legal status
- Legal status: AU: S4 (Prescription only); UK: POM (Prescription only); US: ℞-only; EU: Rx-only

Identifiers
- IUPAC name: 2-[(1S, 2S, 4R, 8S, 9S,11S, 12S, 13R)-6-cyclohexyl-11-hydroxy-9, 13-dimethyl-16-oxo-5, 7-dioxapentacyclo [10.8.0.0^{2,9}.0^{4, 8}.0^{13,18}] icosa-14, 17-dien-8-yl]- 2-oxoethyl 2-methylpropanoate
- CAS Number: 126544-47-6
- PubChem CID: 6918155
- IUPHAR/BPS: 7469
- DrugBank: DB01410
- ChemSpider: 5293368
- UNII: S59502J185
- KEGG: D01703
- ChEMBL: ChEMBL1201164
- CompTox Dashboard (EPA): DTXSID9046659
- ECHA InfoCard: 100.210.908

Chemical and physical data
- Formula: C_{32}H_{44}O_{7}
- Molar mass: 540.697 g·mol^{−1}
- 3D model (JSmol): Interactive image
- SMILES: O=C(OCC(=O)[C@]25O[C@@H](O[C@@H]5C[C@H]1[C@H]4[C@H]([C@@H](O)C[C@@]12C)[C@]/3(/C=C\C(=O)\C=C\3CC4)C)C6CCCCC6)C(C)C
- InChI: InChI=1S/C32H44O7/c1-18(2)28(36)37-17-25(35)32-26(38-29(39-32)19-8-6-5-7-9-19)15-23-22-11-10-20-14-21(33)12-13-30(20,3)27(22)24(34)16-31(23,32)4/h12-14,18-19,22-24,26-27,29,34H,5-11,15-17H2,1-4H3/t22-,23-,24-,26+,27+,29+,30-,31-,32+/m0/s1; Key:LUKZNWIVRBCLON-GXOBDPJESA-N

Ciclesonide, sold under the brand name Omnaris among others, is a glucocorticoid used to treat asthma and allergic rhinitis.

Side effects of the medication include headache, nosebleeds, and inflammation of the nose and throat linings.

It was patented in 1990 and approved for medical use in 2005. The drug was approved for adults and children 12 and over by the US Food and Drug Administration in October 2006. It is on the World Health Organization's List of Essential Medicines.

== Society and culture ==
=== Brand names ===
It is marketed under the brand names Alvesco for asthma and Omnaris, Omniair, Zetonna, and Alvesco for hay fever in the US and Canada.
