= Fluperolone =

Chemical compound

Clinical data
- Other names: 9α-Fluoro-11β,17α,21-trihydroxy-21-methylpregna-1,4-diene-3,20-dione
- Drug class: Corticosteroid; Glucocorticoid

Identifiers
- IUPAC name: (8S,9R,10S,11S,13S,14S,17R)-9-Fluoro-11,17-dihydroxy-17-[(2S)-2-hydroxypropanoyl]-10,13-dimethyl-6,7,8,11,12,14,15,16-octahydrocyclopenta[a]phenanthren-3-one
- CAS Number: 3841-11-0
- PubChem CID: 56841872
- ChemSpider: 32700976
- UNII: S33056JLS5
- CompTox Dashboard (EPA): DTXSID60191746

Chemical and physical data
- Formula: C_{22}H_{29}FO_{5}
- Molar mass: 392.467 g·mol^{−1}
- 3D model (JSmol): Interactive image
- SMILES: C[C@@H](C(=O)[C@]1(CC[C@@H]2[C@@]1(C[C@@H]([C@]3([C@H]2CCC4=CC(=O)C=C[C@@]43C)F)O)C)O)O
- InChI: InChI=1S/C22H29FO5/c1-12(24)18(27)21(28)9-7-15-16-5-4-13-10-14(25)6-8-19(13,2)22(16,23)17(26)11-20(15,21)3/h6,8,10,12,15-17,24,26,28H,4-5,7,9,11H2,1-3H3/t12-,15-,16-,17-,19-,20-,21-,22-/m0/s1; Key:SLVCCRYLKTYUQP-DVTGEIKXSA-N

Fluperolone is a synthetic glucocorticoid corticosteroid which was never marketed. An acetate ester of fluperolone, fluperolone acetate, in contrast, has been marketed.
