= Fluocortolone =

Chemical compound

Clinical data
- Other names: (6S,8S,9R,10S,11S,13S,14S,16R,17S)-6-fluoro-11-hydroxy-17-(2-hydroxyacetyl)-10,13,16-trimethyl-6,7,8,9,11,12,14,15,16,17-decahydrocyclopenta[a]phenanthren-3-one
- Routes of administration: Ointment, suppositories
- ATC code: C05AA08 (WHO) D07AC05 (WHO) H02AB03 (WHO)

Identifiers
- IUPAC name: (1S,2R,8S,10S,11S,13R,14S,15S,17S)-8-fluoro-17-hydroxy-14-(2-hydroxyacetyl)-2,13,15-trimethyltetracyclo[8.7.0.0^{2,7}.0^{11,15}]heptadeca-3,6-dien-5-one
- CAS Number: 152-97-6
- PubChem CID: 9053
- DrugBank: DB08971
- ChemSpider: 8701
- UNII: 65VXC1MH0J
- KEGG: D04218
- ChEMBL: ChEMBL251634
- CompTox Dashboard (EPA): DTXSID00861835
- ECHA InfoCard: 100.005.284

Chemical and physical data
- Formula: C_{22}H_{29}FO_{4}
- Molar mass: 376.468 g·mol^{−1}
- 3D model (JSmol): Interactive image
- SMILES: O=C\1\C=C/[C@]4(/C(=C/1)[C@@H](F)C[C@@H]2[C@@H]4[C@@H](O)C[C@@]3([C@@H](C(=O)CO)[C@@H](C[C@@H]23)C)C)C
- InChI: InChI=1S/C22H29FO4/c1-11-6-14-13-8-16(23)15-7-12(25)4-5-21(15,2)20(13)17(26)9-22(14,3)19(11)18(27)10-24/h4-5,7,11,13-14,16-17,19-20,24,26H,6,8-10H2,1-3H3/t11-,13+,14+,16+,17+,19-,20-,21+,22+/m1/s1; Key:GAKMQHDJQHZUTJ-ULHLPKEOSA-N

Fluocortolone is a glucocorticoid used in the treatment of several conditions, including hemorrhoids.

It is similar to fluocortin, but with one less carbonyl group.

== See also ==
- Corticosteroids
