= Diflorasone =

Chemical compound

Clinical data
- Other names: 6α,9α-Difluoro-16β-methylprednisolone; 6α,9α-Difluoro-11β,17α,21-trihydroxy-16β-methylpregna-1,4-diene-3,20-dione
- Drug class: Corticosteroid; Glucocorticoid

Identifiers
- IUPAC name: (6S,8S,9R,10S,11S,13S,14S,16S,17R)-6,9-Difluoro-11,17-dihydroxy-17-(2-hydroxyacetyl)-10,13,16-trimethyl-6,7,8,11,12,14,15,16-octahydrocyclopenta[a]phenanthren-3-one
- CAS Number: 2557-49-5
- PubChem CID: 71415
- ChemSpider: 64505
- UNII: T2DHJ9645W
- CompTox Dashboard (EPA): DTXSID201036185
- ECHA InfoCard: 100.018.069

Chemical and physical data
- Formula: C_{22}H_{28}F_{2}O_{5}
- Molar mass: 410.458 g·mol^{−1}
- 3D model (JSmol): Interactive image
- SMILES: C[C@H]1C[C@H]2[C@@H]3C[C@@H](C4=CC(=O)C=C[C@@]4([C@]3([C@H](C[C@@]2([C@]1(C(=O)CO)O)C)O)F)C)F
- InChI: InChI=1S/C22H28F2O5/c1-11-6-13-14-8-16(23)15-7-12(26)4-5-19(15,2)21(14,24)17(27)9-20(13,3)22(11,29)18(28)10-25/h4-5,7,11,13-14,16-17,25,27,29H,6,8-10H2,1-3H3/t11-,13-,14-,16-,17-,19-,20-,21-,22-/m0/s1; Key:WXURHACBFYSXBI-XHIJKXOTSA-N

Diflorasone is a synthetic glucocorticoid corticosteroid which was never marketed. A diacetate ester of diflorasone, diflorasone diacetate, in contrast, has been marketed.
