= Fluorometholone =

Chemical compound

Clinical data
- Other names: (6S,8S,9R,10S,11S,13S,14S,17R)-17-acetyl-9-fluoro-11,17-dihydroxy-6,10,13-trimethyl-6,7,8,11,12,14,15,16-octahydrocyclopenta[a]phenanthren-3-one
- AHFS/Drugs.com: Monograph
- MedlinePlus: a682660
- ATC code: C05AA06 (WHO) D07AB06 (WHO), D07XB04 (WHO) (combinations), D10AA01 (WHO), S01BA07 (WHO)

Legal status
- Legal status: CA: ℞-only

Identifiers
- IUPAC name: (1R,2S,8S,10S,11S,14R,15S,17S)-14-acetyl-1-fluoro-14,17-dihydroxy-2,8,15-trimethyltetracyclo[8.7.0.0^{2,7}.0^{11,15}]heptadeca-3,6-dien-5-one
- CAS Number: 426-13-1
- PubChem CID: 9878
- IUPHAR/BPS: 7079
- DrugBank: DB00324
- ChemSpider: 9494
- UNII: SV0CSG527L
- KEGG: D01367
- ChEBI: CHEBI:31625
- ChEMBL: ChEMBL1200600
- CompTox Dashboard (EPA): DTXSID7047435
- ECHA InfoCard: 100.006.402

Chemical and physical data
- Formula: C_{22}H_{29}FO_{4}
- Molar mass: 376.468 g·mol^{−1}
- 3D model (JSmol): Interactive image
- SMILES: O=C(C)[C@]3(O)[C@]2(C[C@H](O)[C@]4(F)[C@@]/1(\C(=C/C(=O)\C=C\1)[C@@H](C)C[C@H]4[C@@H]2CC3)C)C
- InChI: InChI=1S/C22H29FO4/c1-12-9-17-15-6-8-21(27,13(2)24)20(15,4)11-18(26)22(17,23)19(3)7-5-14(25)10-16(12)19/h5,7,10,12,15,17-18,26-27H,6,8-9,11H2,1-4H3/t12-,15-,17-,18-,19-,20-,21-,22-/m0/s1; Key:FAOZLTXFLGPHNG-KNAQIMQKSA-N

Fluorometholone (INN, BAN, JAN) (brand names Efflumidex, Flucon, FML Forte, FML, others), also known as 6α-methyl-9α-fluoro-11β,17α-dihydroxypregna-1,4-diene-3,20-dione, is a synthetic glucocorticoid which is used in the treatment of inflammatory eye diseases. The C17α acetate ester, fluorometholone acetate (brand name Flarex), is also a glucocorticoid and is used for similar indications.
