= Paramethasone =

Chemical compound

Clinical data
- Other names: (6S,8S,9S,10R,11S,13S,14S,16R,17R)-6-fluoro-11,17-dihydroxy-17-(2-hydroxyacetyl)-10,13,16-trimethyl-7,8,9,11,12,14,15,16-octahydro-6H-cyclopenta[a]phenanthren-3-one
- AHFS/Drugs.com: International Drug Names
- ATC code: H02AB05 (WHO)

Identifiers
- IUPAC name: (6α,11β,16α)-6-fluoro-11,17,21-trihydroxy-16-methylpregna-1,4-diene-3,20-dione
- CAS Number: 53-33-8
- PubChem CID: 5875
- DrugBank: DB01384
- ChemSpider: 5664
- UNII: VFC6ZX3584
- KEGG: C07413
- ChEMBL: ChEMBL1579
- CompTox Dashboard (EPA): DTXSID3023421
- ECHA InfoCard: 100.000.155

Chemical and physical data
- Formula: C_{22}H_{29}FO_{5}
- Molar mass: 392.467 g·mol^{−1}
- 3D model (JSmol): Interactive image
- SMILES: O=C\1\C=C/[C@]4(/C(=C/1)[C@@H](F)C[C@@H]2[C@@H]4[C@@H](O)C[C@@]3([C@@](O)(C(=O)CO)[C@@H](C[C@@H]23)C)C)C
- InChI: InChI=1S/C22H29FO5/c1-11-6-14-13-8-16(23)15-7-12(25)4-5-20(15,2)19(13)17(26)9-21(14,3)22(11,28)18(27)10-24/h4-5,7,11,13-14,16-17,19,24,26,28H,6,8-10H2,1-3H3/t11-,13+,14+,16+,17+,19-,20+,21+,22+/m1/s1; Key:MKPDWECBUAZOHP-AFYJWTTESA-N

Paramethasone is a fluorinated glucocorticoid with anti-inflammatory and immunosuppressant properties.
