= Corticosteroid =

Class of steroid hormones

- Drug class
- Cortisol (hydrocortisone), a corticosteroid with both glucocorticoid and mineralocorticoid activity and effects.

Class identifiers
- Synonyms: Corticoid
- Use: Various
- ATC code: H02
- Biological target: Glucocorticoid receptor, Mineralocorticoid receptor
- Chemical class: Steroids

Legal status

Corticosteroids are a class of steroid hormones that are produced in the adrenal cortex of vertebrates, and also their synthetic analogues. The two main classes of corticosteroids – glucocorticoids and mineralocorticoids – are involved in a wide range of physiological processes, including stress response, immune response, and regulation of inflammation, carbohydrate metabolism, protein catabolism, blood electrolyte levels, and behavior.

Some common naturally occurring steroid hormones are cortisol (C_{21}H_{30}O_{5}), corticosterone (C_{21}H_{30}O_{4}), cortisone (C_{21}H_{28}O_{5}) and aldosterone (C_{21}H_{28}O_{5}) (cortisone and aldosterone are isomers). The main corticosteroids produced by the adrenal cortex are cortisol and aldosterone.

In medical usage, corticosteroid is often used as a synonym for glucocorticoids, the most widely used class of corticosteroid medication.

== Etymology ==
The etymology of the cortico- part of the name refers to the adrenal cortex, which makes these steroid hormones. Thus a corticosteroid is a "cortex steroid".

== Classes ==
Cortisol

Cortisone

Corticosterone

Aldosterone

- Glucocorticoids such as cortisol affect carbohydrate, fat, and protein metabolism, and have anti-inflammatory, immunosuppressive, anti-proliferative, and vasoconstrictive effects. Anti-inflammatory effects are mediated by blocking the action of inflammatory mediators (transrepression) and inducing anti-inflammatory mediators (transactivation). Immunosuppressive effects are mediated by suppressing delayed hypersensitivity reactions by direct action on T-lymphocytes. Anti-proliferative effects are mediated by inhibition of DNA synthesis and epidermal cell turnover. Vasoconstrictive effects are mediated by inhibiting the action of inflammatory mediators such as histamine.
- Mineralocorticoids such as aldosterone are primarily involved in the regulation of electrolyte and water balance by modulating ion transport in the epithelial cells of the renal tubules of the kidney.

== Medical uses ==
Synthetic pharmaceutical drugs with corticosteroid-like effects are used in a variety of conditions, ranging from hematological neoplasms to brain tumors or skin diseases. Dexamethasone and its derivatives are almost pure glucocorticoids, while prednisone and its derivatives have some mineralocorticoid action in addition to the glucocorticoid effect. Fludrocortisone (Florinef) is a synthetic mineralocorticoid. Hydrocortisone (cortisol) is typically used for replacement therapy, e.g. for adrenal insufficiency and congenital adrenal hyperplasia.

Medical conditions treated with systemic corticosteroids (this list applies to glucocorticoids):

- Allergy and respirology medicine
  - Asthma (severe exacerbations)
  - Chronic obstructive pulmonary disease (COPD)
  - Allergic rhinitis
  - Atopic dermatitis
  - Hives
  - Angioedema
  - Anaphylaxis
  - Food allergies
  - Drug allergies
  - Nasal polyps
  - Hypersensitivity pneumonitis
  - Sarcoidosis
  - Eosinophilic pneumonia
  - Some other types of pneumonia (in addition to the traditional antibiotic treatment protocols)
  - Interstitial lung disease
- Dermatology
  - Pemphigus vulgaris
  - Contact dermatitis
- Endocrinology (usually at physiologic doses)
  - Addison's disease
  - Adrenal insufficiency
  - Congenital adrenal hyperplasia
- Gastroenterology
  - Ulcerative colitis
  - Crohn's disease
  - Autoimmune hepatitis
- Hematology
  - Lymphoma
  - Leukemia
  - Hemolytic anemia
  - Idiopathic thrombocytopenic purpura
  - Multiple Myeloma
- Rheumatology/Immunology
  - Rheumatoid arthritis
  - Systemic lupus erythematosus
  - Polymyalgia rheumatica
  - Polymyositis
  - Dermatomyositis
  - Polyarteritis
  - Vasculitis
- Ophthalmology
  - Uveitis
  - Optic neuritis
  - Keratoconjunctivitis
- Other conditions
  - Multiple sclerosis relapses
  - Organ transplantation
  - Nephrotic syndrome
  - Chronic hepatitis (flare ups)
  - Cerebral edema
  - IgG4-related disease
  - Prostate cancer
  - Tendinosis
  - Lichen planus

Topical formulations are also available for the skin, eyes (uveitis), lungs (asthma), nose (rhinitis), and bowels. Corticosteroids are also used supportively to prevent nausea, often in combination with 5-HT_{3} antagonists (e.g., ondansetron).

Corticosteroids have been widely used in treating people with traumatic brain injury. A systematic review identified 20 randomised controlled trials and included 12,303 participants, then compared patients who received corticosteroids with patients who received no treatment. The authors recommended people with traumatic head injury should not be routinely treated with corticosteroids.

== Pharmacology ==
Corticosteroids act as agonists of the glucocorticoid receptor and/or the mineralocorticoid receptor.

In addition to their corticosteroid activity, some corticosteroids may have some progestogenic activity and may produce sex-related side effects.

== Adverse effects ==
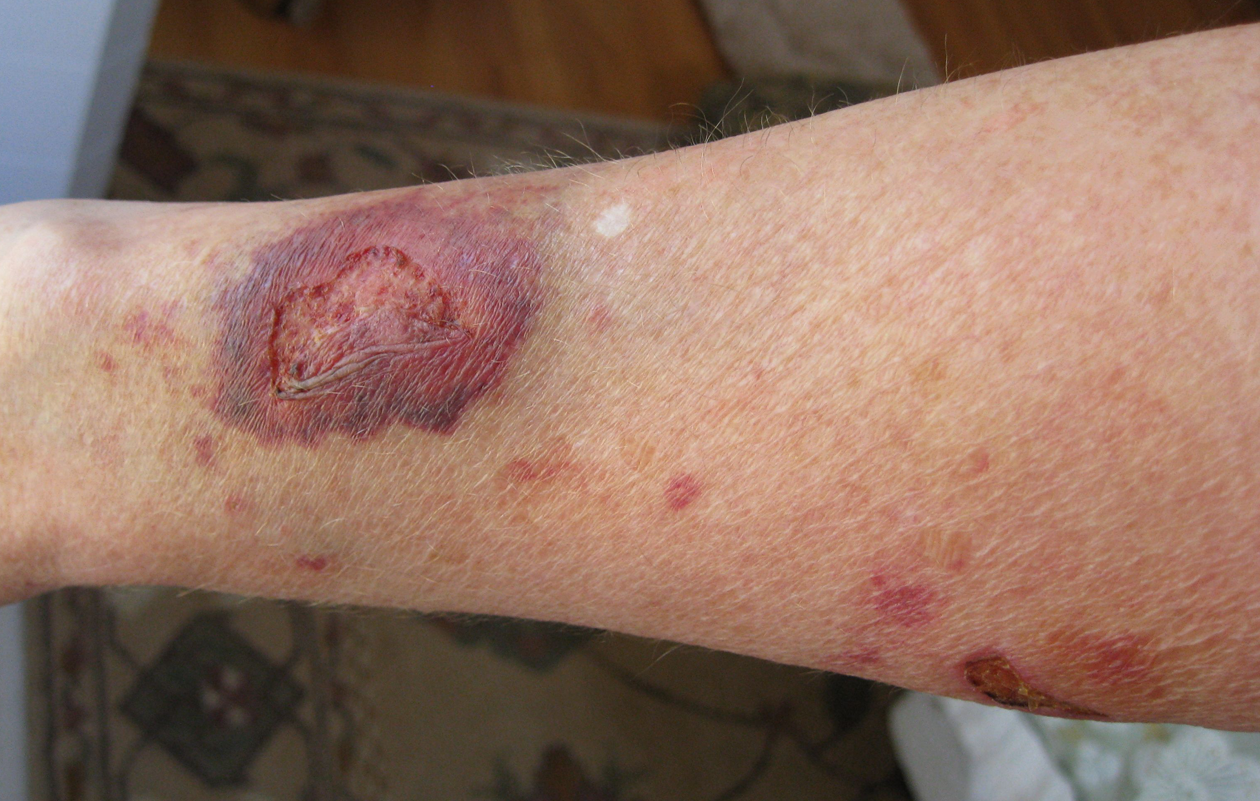
Lower arm of a 47-year-old female showing skin damage caused by topical corticosteroid (glucocorticoid) use.

Typical undesired effects of glucocorticoids present quite uniformly as drug-induced Cushing's syndrome. Typical mineralocorticoid side-effects are hypertension (abnormally high blood pressure), steroid induced diabetes mellitus, psychosis, poor sleep, hypokalemia (low potassium levels in the blood), hypernatremia (high sodium levels in the blood) without causing peripheral edema, metabolic alkalosis and connective tissue weakness. Wound healing or ulcer formation may be inhibited by the immunosuppressive effects.

A variety of steroid medications, from anti-allergy nasal sprays (Nasonex, Flonase) to topical skin creams, to eye drops (Tobradex), to prednisone have been implicated in the development of central serous retinopathy (CSR).

Use of corticosteroids has numerous side-effects, some of which may be severe:

Neuropsychiatric
steroid psychosis, and anxiety, depression. (This applies mainly to glucocorticoids as they mimic the effect of cortisol. The mineralocorticoid receptor also plays a role in fear extinction, but is not as pronounced in its effects.)
Therapeutic doses of glucocorticoids may cause a feeling of artificial well-being known as "steroid euphoria". Rare case reports of corticosteroid (mainly glucocorticoid) misuse, addiction, and dependence due to euphoria exist.
The neuropsychiatric effects are partly mediated by sensitization of the body to the actions of adrenaline. Therapeutically, the bulk of corticosteroid dose is given in the morning to mimic the body's diurnal rhythm; if given at night, the feeling of being energized will interfere with sleep. An extensive review is provided by Flores and Gumina.
Cardiovascular
Corticosteroids (mineralocorticoids) can cause sodium retention through a direct action on the kidney, in a manner analogous to aldosterone. This can result in fluid retention and hypertension.
Metabolic/Endocrine
Corticosteroids (glucocorticoids) cause a movement of body fat to the face and torso, resulting in "moon face", "buffalo hump", and "pot belly" or "beer belly", and cause movement of body fat away from the limbs. This has been termed corticosteroid-induced lipodystrophy. Due to the diversion of amino-acids to glucose, they are considered anti-anabolic, and long term therapy can cause muscle wasting (muscle atrophy). Besides muscle atrophy, steroid myopathy includes muscle pains (myalgias), muscle weakness (typically of the proximal muscles), serum creatine kinase normal, EMG myopathic, and some have type II (fast-twitch/glycolytic) fibre atrophy.
By increasing the production of glucose from amino-acid breakdown and opposing the action of insulin, corticosteroids (glucocorticoids) can cause hyperglycemia, insulin resistance and diabetes mellitus.
Skeletal
Steroid-induced osteoporosis may be a side-effect of long-term corticosteroid (glucocorticoid) use. Use of inhaled corticosteroids among children with asthma may result in decreased height.
Gastro-intestinal
While cases of colitis have been reported, corticosteroids (glucocorticoids) are often prescribed when the colitis, although due to suppression of the immune response to pathogens, should be considered only after ruling out infection or microbe/fungal overgrowth in the gastrointestinal tract. While the evidence for corticosteroids causing peptic ulceration is relatively poor except for high doses taken for over a month, the majority of doctors as of 2010 still believe this is the case, and would consider protective prophylactic measures.
Eyes
chronic use may predispose to cataract and glaucoma. Clinical and experimental evidence indicates that corticosteroids can cause permanent eye damage by inducing central serous retinopathy (CSR, also known as central serous chorioretinopathy, CSC). This should be borne in mind when treating patients with optic neuritis. There is experimental and clinical evidence that, at least in optic neuritis, speed of treatment initiation is important.
Vulnerability to infection
By suppressing immune reactions (which is one of the main reasons for their use in allergies), glucocorticoids may cause infections to flare up, notably candidiasis.

Severe amoebic colitis
Fulminant amoebic colitis is associated with high case fatality and can occur in patients infected with the parasite Entamoeba histolytica after exposure to glucocorticoid medications.

Pregnancy
Corticosteroids have a low but significant teratogenic effect, causing a few birth defects per 1,000 pregnant women treated. Corticosteroids are therefore contraindicated in pregnancy.
Habituation
Topical steroid addiction (TSA) or red burning skin has been reported in long-term users of topical steroids (glucocorticoids), users who applied topical steroids to their skin over a period of weeks, months, or years. TSA is characterised by uncontrollable, spreading dermatitis and worsening skin inflammation which requires a stronger topical steroid to get the same result as the first prescription. When topical steroid medication is lost, the skin experiences redness, burning, itching, hot skin, swelling, and/or oozing for a length of time. This is also called 'red skin syndrome' or 'topical steroid withdrawal' (TSW). After the withdrawal period is over the atopic dermatitis can cease or is less severe than it was before.
Children
In children the short term use of steroids (glucocorticoids) by mouth increases the risk of vomiting, behavioral changes, and sleeping problems.
Dysphonia
Inhaled corticosteroids (glucocorticoids) are used for treatment of asthma as a standard treatment. This can cause local adverse effects like vocal cord dysfunction.

== Biosynthesis ==
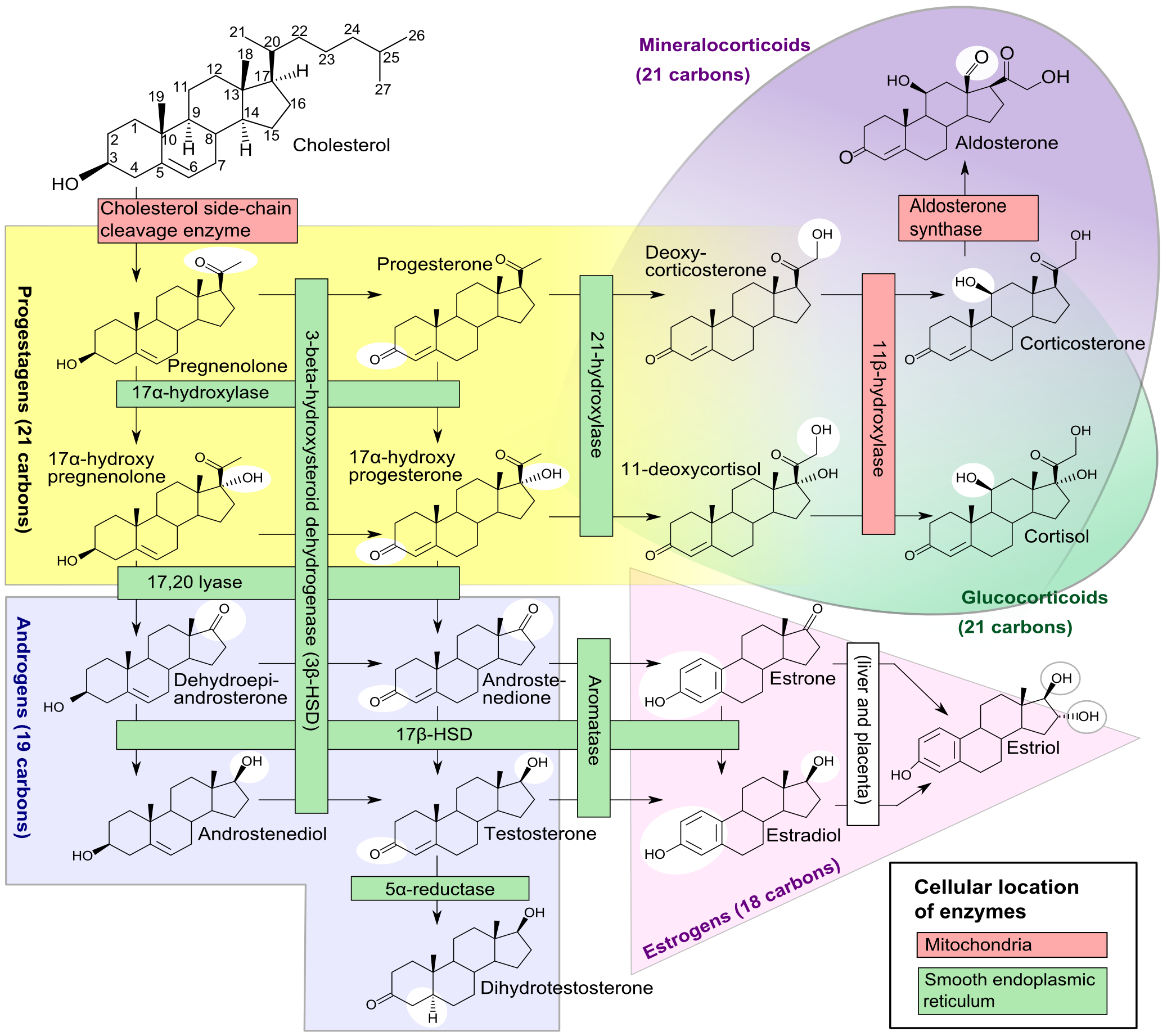
Steroidogenesis, including corticosteroid biosynthesis.

The corticosteroids are synthesized from cholesterol within the adrenal cortex. Most steroidogenic reactions are catalysed by enzymes of the cytochrome P450 family. They are located within the mitochondria and require adrenodoxin as a cofactor (except 21-hydroxylase and 17α-hydroxylase).

Aldosterone and corticosterone share the first part of their biosynthetic pathway. The last part is mediated either by the aldosterone synthase (for aldosterone) or by the 11β-hydroxylase (for corticosterone). These enzymes are nearly identical (they share 11β-hydroxylation and 18-hydroxylation functions), but aldosterone synthase is also able to perform an 18-oxidation. Moreover, aldosterone synthase is found within the zona glomerulosa at the outer edge of the adrenal cortex; 11β-hydroxylase is found in the zona fasciculata and zona glomerulosa.

== Classification ==
=== By chemical structure ===
In general, corticosteroids are grouped into four classes, based on chemical structure. Allergic reactions to one member of a class typically indicate an intolerance of all members of the class. This is known as the "Coopman classification".

The highlighted steroids are often used in the screening of allergies to topical steroids.

==== Group A – Hydrocortisone type ====
Hydrocortisone, hydrocortisone acetate, cortisone acetate, tixocortol pivalate, prednisolone, methylprednisolone, and prednisone.

==== Group B – Acetonides (and related substances) ====
Amcinonide, budesonide, desonide, fluocinolone acetonide, fluocinonide, halcinonide, triamcinolone acetonide, and Deflazacort (O-isopropylidene derivative)

==== Group C – Betamethasone type ====
Beclometasone, betamethasone, dexamethasone, fluocortolone, halometasone, and mometasone.

==== Group D – Esters ====
===== Group D_{1} – Halogenated (less labile) =====
Alclometasone dipropionate, betamethasone dipropionate, betamethasone valerate, clobetasol propionate, clobetasone butyrate, fluprednidene acetate, and mometasone furoate.

===== Group D_{2} – Labile prodrug esters =====
Ciclesonide, cortisone acetate, hydrocortisone aceponate, hydrocortisone acetate, hydrocortisone buteprate, hydrocortisone butyrate, hydrocortisone valerate, prednicarbate, and tixocortol pivalate.

=== By route of administration ===
==== Topical steroids ====
For use topically on the skin, eye, and mucous membranes.

Topical corticosteroids are divided in potency classes I to IV in most countries (A to D in Japan). Seven categories are used in the United States to determine the level of potency of any given topical corticosteroid.

==== Inhaled steroids ====
For nasal mucosa, sinuses, bronchi, and lungs.

This group includes:

- Flunisolide
- Fluticasone furoate
- Fluticasone propionate
- Triamcinolone acetonide
- Beclomethasone dipropionate
- Budesonide
- Mometasone furoate
- Ciclesonide

There also exist certain combination preparations such as Advair Diskus in the United States, containing fluticasone propionate and salmeterol (a long-acting bronchodilator), and Symbicort, containing budesonide and formoterol fumarate dihydrate (another long-acting bronchodilator). They are both approved for use in children over 12 years old.

==== Oral forms ====
Such as prednisone, prednisolone, methylprednisolone, or dexamethasone.

==== Systemic forms ====
Available in injectables for intravenous and parenteral routes.

== History ==
Introduction of early corticosteroids
Corticosteroid	Introduced
Cortisone	1948
Hydrocortisone	1951
Fludrocortisone acetate	1954
Prednisolone	1955
Prednisone	1955
Methylprednisolone	1956
Triamcinolone	1956
Dexamethasone	1958
Betamethasone	1958
Triamcinolone acetonide	1958
Fluorometholone	1959
Deflazacort	1969

Tadeusz Reichstein, Edward Calvin Kendall, and Philip Showalter Hench were awarded the Nobel Prize for Physiology and Medicine in 1950 for their work on hormones of the adrenal cortex, which culminated in the isolation of cortisone.

Initially hailed as a miracle cure and liberally prescribed during the 1950s, steroid treatment brought about adverse events of such a magnitude that the next major category of anti-inflammatory drugs, the nonsteroidal anti-inflammatory drugs (NSAIDs), was so named in order to demarcate from the opprobrium.

Lewis Sarett of Merck & Co. was the first to synthesize cortisone, using a 36-step process that started with deoxycholic acid, which was extracted from ox bile. The low efficiency of converting deoxycholic acid into cortisone led to a cost of US$200 per gram in 1947. Russell Marker, at Syntex, discovered a much cheaper and more convenient starting material, diosgenin from wild Mexican yams. His conversion of diosgenin into progesterone by a four-step process now known as Marker degradation was an important step in mass production of all steroidal hormones, including cortisone and chemicals used in hormonal contraception.

In 1952, D.H. Peterson and H.C. Murray of Upjohn developed a process that used Rhizopus mold to oxidize progesterone into a compound that was readily converted to cortisone. The ability to cheaply synthesize large quantities of cortisone from the diosgenin in yams resulted in a rapid drop in price to US$6 per gram, falling to $0.46 per gram by 1980. Percy Julian's research also aided progress in the field. The exact nature of cortisone's anti-inflammatory action remained a mystery for years after, however, until the leukocyte adhesion cascade and the role of phospholipase A2 in the production of prostaglandins and leukotrienes was fully understood in the early 1980s.

Corticosteroids were voted Allergen of the Year in 2005 by the American Contact Dermatitis Society.

== See also ==
- List of corticosteroids
- List of corticosteroid cyclic ketals
- List of corticosteroid esters
- List of steroid abbreviations
