= Topical glucocorticoids =

Drug class

Topical glucocorticoids are the topical forms of glucocorticoids. Topical glucocorticoids are used in the treatment of many skin conditions. They provide anti-inflammatory, antimitotic, and immune-system suppressing actions through various mechanisms.

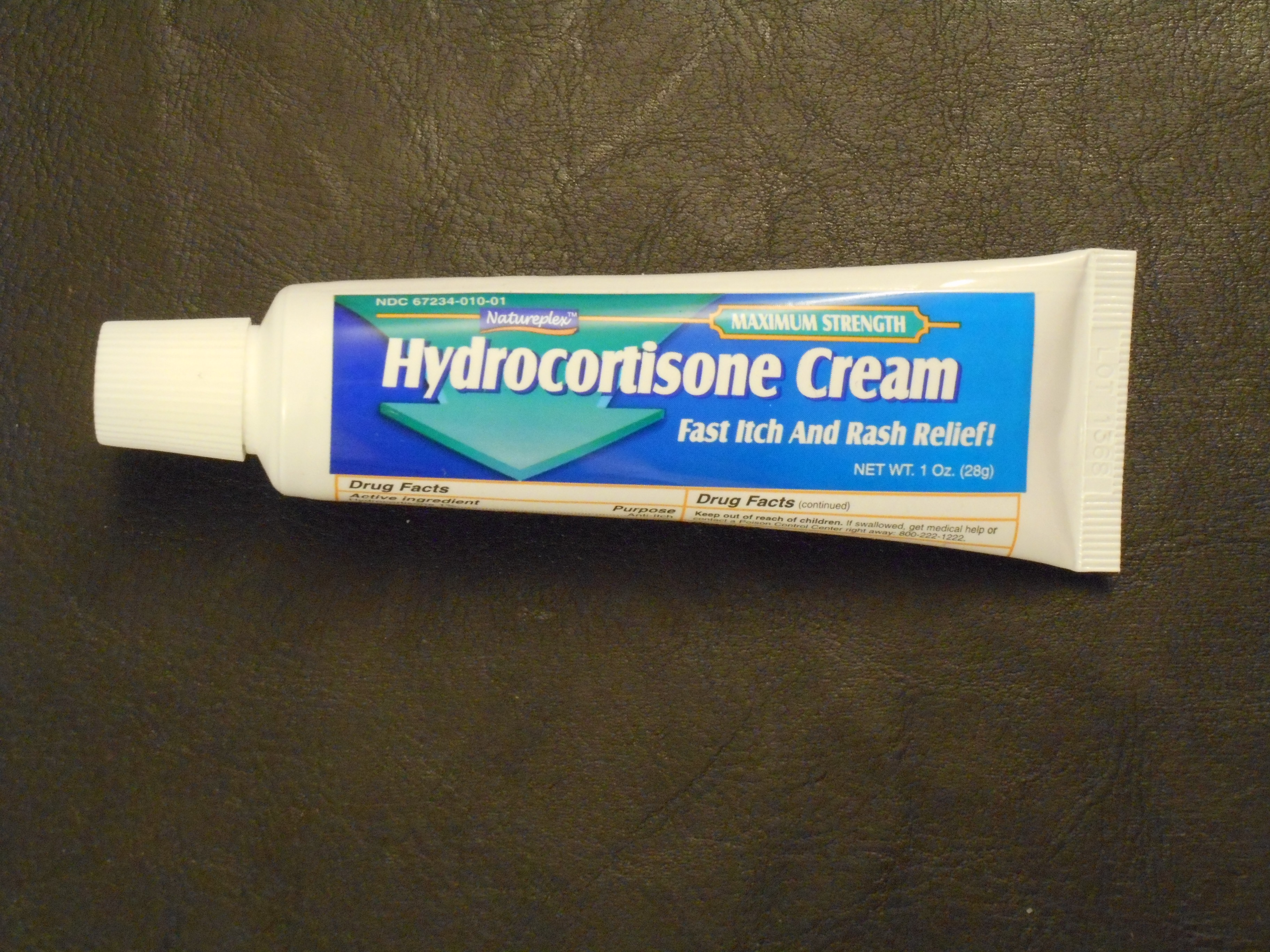
Hydrocortisone cream is a type of topical glucocorticoid that is commonly found on the market.

== Medical Uses ==
Topical glucocorticoids are indicated for the treatment of a variety of skin conditions:

- Eczema
- Atopic dermatitis
- Psoriasis
- Vitiligo
- Phimosis
- Acute radiation dermatitis
- Lichen sclerosus

== Formulations ==
Topical glucocorticoids are available in different formulations. If an inappropriate formulation is administered, the therapeutic effect of the treatment may be delayed and rendered insufficient. The condition will even be worsened in some cases. For instance, usage of a topical glucocorticoid gel on fissured hand eczema intensifies the pain as well as stinging because of the alcohol present in the gel. If an ointment is applied on a moist skin injury, it might lead to follicle infection due to the occlusive features of the ointment.

=== Ointments ===
Ointments are formed with water suspended in oil. Ointments are effective lubricants that can retain heat, lower the loss of water from the skin and provide better absorption of medication. Ointments are also semi-occlusive. Ointments are usually the most effective formulations for topical glucocorticoids because of their occlusive effect. However, acceptance and compliance of patients to the pharmacological treatment may be relatively low as they are oily, tacky, and usually cannot be applied to large or hairy areas.

=== Creams ===
Creams are semi-solid emulsions consisting of oil suspended in water. They are of pleasant appearance and can be rinsed away by water. Regarding the same topical glucocorticoid, creams are generally more potent than lotions but less effective than ointments. Creams are especially useful in acute inflammation with exudates due to their drying effects. Creams can also be applied to intertriginous areas that are inappropriate for the application of ointments.

=== Lotions ===
Lotions refer to suspensions or solutions of drugs in water, alcohol, or other types of solvent. Therefore, the container should be shaked adequately to ensure the drug is mixed well with the solvent before each dosage to achieve the best therapeutic effect. Lotions are especially effective in hairy areas and also in situations where the medication has to be applied in large areas on the body. Lotions exert a cooling and drying effect as they dry, making them to be effective in moist skin lesions and/or in itching.

=== Gels ===
Gels are emulsions with oil suspended in water containing alcohol in the base. Gels have a jelly-like property and dry in a thin and watery film. Gel formulations have therapeutic effects as good as ointments and appearance as cosmetically appealing as creams, resulting in a high patient acceptance. Gels are absorbed readily and are appropriate for distributing topical glucocorticoids to hairy areas. Gels are especially effective for inflammation with exudates.

=== Foams ===
Foams spread efficiently and are easier to be applied than other preparations, especially for skin inflammation and scalp conditions. Foams can be applied and spread readily, especially in hairy areas. The compliance for foam formulations is usually high. However, due to the difficulty in designing appropriate vehicles, foam formulations are generally higher in price than other formulations.

== Pharmacology ==
=== Mechanism of action ===
Topical glucocorticoids alter the functions of epidermal and dermal cells as well as that of the white blood cells involved in proliferative and inflammatory skin diseases.

Topical glucocorticoids act as agonists for the cytoplasmic glucocorticoid receptor. After binding to the receptor, the complex is then transported into the nucleus. Within the nucleus, the complex binds to the glucocorticoid response elements in the promoter region of target genes. This results in the regulation of gene expression through altering the rate of transcription of certain mRNA. As mRNA acts as a template for protein synthesis, topical glucocorticoids can either enhance or suppress the synthesis of specific proteins. This series of events lead to numerous effects. Transcription factors that are responsible for the synthesis of inflammation mediators including macrophages, eosinophils, lymphocytes, mast cells and dendritic cells are inhibited, anti-inflammatory proteins such as lipocortin are released and cell division of epidermal cells and dermal fibroblasts is inhibited.

=== Pharmacokinetics ===
There are many factors determining the extent of absorption of topical glucocorticoids, including:

- Body area of application; body regions with thin skin are significantly more permeable to topical glucocorticoid than areas with thick skin.
- Condition of the skin; topical glucocorticoids are absorbed for a larger extent through areas of inflammation or in peeled areas when compared to normal skin
- Age of the patient; infants and young kids who have much thinner skin than that of adults absorb topical glucocorticoids more easily
- Presence of urea, dimethylsulphoxide, or other agents (e.g. salicylic acid) in vehicle that will raise the absorption rate
- Placement of occlusive dressing on the body area, that will raise the absorption rate

The differences in extent of percutaneous absorption in different parts of the body (percent of the total dose absorbed into the body through the skin) are as follows:

- Sole – 0.05%
- Palm – 0.1%
- Forearm – 1%
- Scalp – 3.5%
- Face – 7%
- Eyelids and genitalia – 30%

== Adverse Effects ==
Topical glucocorticoids are generally safer than systemic glucocorticoids. However, cutaneous and systemic adverse effects may happen, especially with the use of superpotent and potent topical glucocorticoids or excessive use of lower-potency agents.

=== Cutaneous ===
Appearance of purpura on the skin.

Withdrawal syndrome: Withdrawal of topical glucocorticoids after long-term use, particularly on the face or genitals, may bring about different kinds of signs and symptoms including redness of the skin, burning or stinging sensation, itching, pain, and hot flashes on the face. These symptoms could persist for days to weeks after glucocorticoids withdrawal.

Allergic reaction: The vehicles (solvent containing the drug) or preservatives are usually the agents causing sensitivity, although allergy due to the contact with glucocorticoids merely is possible. Contact allergy caused by topical glucocorticoid should be suspected in patients with chronic skin conditions that do not seem to improve but instead, is worsened by the treatment.

Other: Other cutaneous adverse effect of topical glucocorticoid consist of appearance of purpura (red discoloured spots) on the skin, changes in pigmentation, and abnormal hair growth.

=== Systemic ===
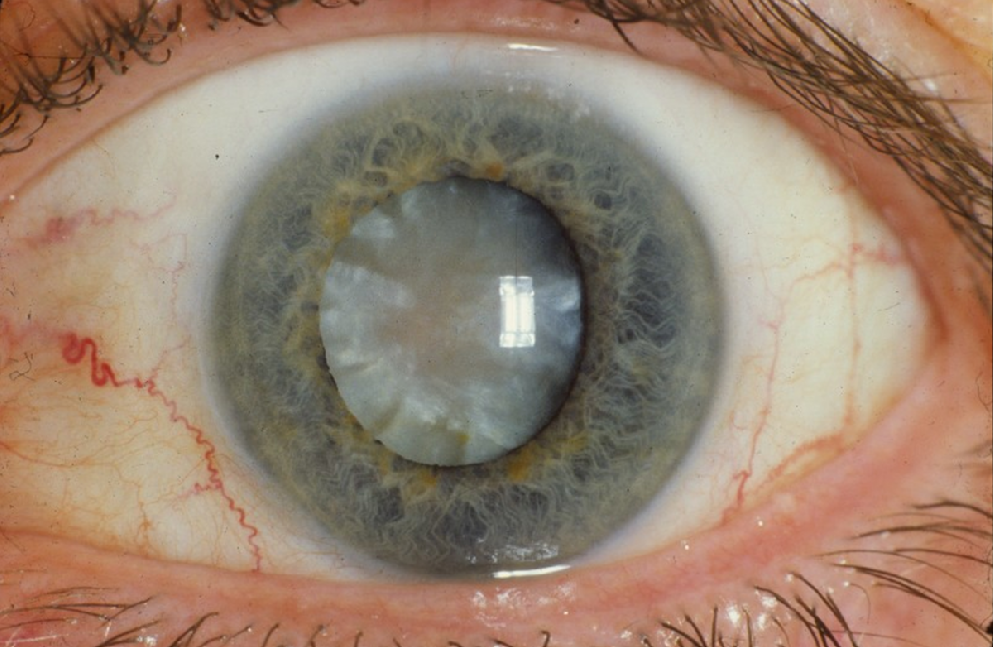
A human eye with cataract.

Some topical glucocorticoids can cause hypothalamic-pituitary axis (HPA) suppression. Reasons that lead to suppression of the HPA include the use of high-potency glucocorticoids, long-term use, application to highly permeable areas, treatment of large areas, occlusion, changed skin barrier and young age. Regular use of even mild glucocorticoids in young kids can lead to HPA suppression.

Rarely, long-term application of high-potency topical glucocorticoids around the eyes may induce glaucoma or cataracts.

The incorrect use of topical glucocorticoids can worsen or cover the typical clinical signs of the appearance of fungal skin infections.

== Cautions ==
=== Use in children ===
To reduce the risk of adverse events, high-potency glucocorticoid should not be applied on the face, intertriginous areas, areas with thin layers of skin (e.g. the perineum, armpit) in children. Moreover, high-potency glucocorticoid should be applied to skin only once a day and should not be used for more than fourteen days. Even low-potency topical glucocorticoids are able to cause adverse effects in children when used for prolonged periods of time.

Generally, a smaller dose of topical glucocorticoid is required by children for a given condition than adults, as children have relatively smaller body surface area compared to adults.

=== Use during pregnancy or lactation ===
Based on the evidence that are currently available, the use of low- to medium-potency topical glucocorticoid is not found to raise the risk of adverse effects for the mother and the baby, such as preterm delivery, birth defects, and low birth weight. However, since the correlation between long-term use of potent topical glucocorticoid in pregnant women and low birth weight cannot be neglected, pregnant women who require topical glucocorticoids should be administered with low- or medium-potency agents instead of potent or superpotent ones. If potent or superpotent topical glucocorticoids are necessary in pregnant women, they should only be administered for a short period of time, the dose used should also be minimised, and growth of the baby should be closely monitored.

== Classifications ==
=== USA Classification System ===
Topical glucocorticoid causes cutaneous vasoconstriction in proportion with their potency. With reference to the United States classification system, topical glucocorticoid can be classified into seven groups, with group 1 being the most potent and group 7 the least potent.

==== Super-high potency (Group 1) ====
- Betamethasone dipropionate, augmented 0.05%
- Clobetasol propionate 0.05%
- Diflucortolone valerate 0.3% (not available in the US)
- Fluocinonide 0.1%
- Flurandrenolide 4 mcg/cm^{2}
- Halobetasol propionate 0.05%

==== High potency (Group 2) ====
- Amcinonide 0.1%
- Betamethasone dipropionate 0.05%
- Clobetasol propionate 0.025%
- Desoximetasone 0.25%
- Diflorasone diacetate 0.05%
- Fluocinonide 0.05%
- Halcinonide 0.1%
- Halobetasol propionate 0.01%

==== Higher-mid potency (Group 3) ====
- Amcinonide 0.1%
- Betamethasone dipropionate 0.05%
- Betamethasone valerate 0.1%
- Desoximetasone 0.05%
- Diflorasone diacetate 0.05%
- Diflucortolone valerate 0.1% (not available in the US)
- Fluocinonide 0.05%
- Fluticasone propionate 0.005%
- Mometasone furoate 0.1%
- Triamcinolone acetonide 0.5%

==== Medium potency (Group 4) ====
- Betamethasone dipropionate 0.05%
- Clocortolone pivalate 0.1%
- Fluocinolone acetonide 0.025%
- Flurandrenolide 0.05%
- Hydrocortisone valerate 0.2%
- Mometasone furoate 0.1%
- Triamcinolone acetonide 0.1%

==== Lower-mid potency (Group 5) ====
- Betamethasone dipropionate 0.05%
- Betamethasone valerate 0.1%
- Desonide 0.05%
- Fluocinolone acetonide 0.025%
- Flurandrenolide 0.05%
- Fluticasone propionate 0.05%
- Hydrocortisone butyrate 0.1%
- Hydrocortisone probutate 0.1%
- Hydrocortisone valerate 0.2%
- Prednicarbate 0.1%
- Triamcinolone acetonide 0.1%

==== Low potency (Group 6) ====
- Alclometasone dipropionate 0.05%
- Betamethasone valerate 0.1%
- Desonide 0.05%
- Fluocinolone acetonide 0.01%
- Triamcinolone acetonide 0.025%

==== Least potent (Group 7) ====
- Hydrocortisone (base, ≥2%) 2.5%
- Hydrocortisone (base, <2%) 1%
- Hydrocortisone acetate 2.5%

== Society ==
=== Topical Glucocorticoid Phobia ===
Topical glucocorticoid phobia is a concern or fear about using topical glucocorticoids, which is commonly found among patients with atopic dermatitis and their caregivers. This phenomenon has been identified in more than 15 countries globally, including Canada, France, Japan, the United Kingdom, and the United States. The most prevalent causes for topical glucocorticoid phobia were found to be the concern regarding skin thinning as well as that regarding systemic absorption that could possibly affect growth and development. This phenomenon may be associated with low adherence to topical glucocorticoid therapies.

The extent of corticosteroid fears is independent of corticosteroid acceptability, but correlates with patients' quality of life. Desensitization of parental corticosteroid fears should be integral part of eczema education and therapeutics in order to improve therapeutic efficacy and patients' quality of life.

== See also ==
- Glucocorticoid
- Corticosteroid
- Topical medication
