= Topical steroid =

Medication for skin

Topical steroids are the topical forms of corticosteroids. Topical steroids are the most commonly prescribed topical medications for the treatment of rash and eczema. Topical steroids have anti-inflammatory properties and are classified based on their skin vasoconstrictive abilities. There are numerous topical steroid products. All the preparations in each class have the same anti-inflammatory properties but essentially differ in base and price.

Side effects may occur from sudden discontinuation and prolonged, continuous use can lead to skin thinning. Intermittent use of topical steroids for atopic dermatitis is safe and does not cause skin thinning.

== Medical uses ==
Weaker topical steroids are utilized for thin-skinned and sensitive areas, especially areas under occlusion, such as the armpit, groin, buttock crease, and breast folds. Weaker steroids are used on the face, eyelids, diaper area, perianal skin, and intertrigo of the groin or body folds. Moderate steroids are used for atopic dermatitis, nummular eczema, xerotic eczema, lichen sclerosis et atrophicus of the vulva, scabies (after scabiecide) and severe dermatitis. Strong steroids are used for psoriasis, lichen planus, discoid lupus, chapped feet, lichen simplex chronicus, severe poison ivy exposure, alopecia areata, nummular eczema, and severe atopic dermatitis in adults.

For treating atopic dermatitis, newer (second generation) corticosteroids, such as fluticasone propionate and mometasone furoate, are more effective and safer than older ones. They are also generally safe and do not cause skin thinning when used intermittently to treat atopic dermatitis flare-ups. They are also safe when used twice a week for preventing flares (also known as weekend treatment). Applying once daily is enough as it is as effective as twice or more daily application.

To prevent tachyphylaxis, a topical steroid is often prescribed to be used on a week on, week off routine. Some recommend using the topical steroid for 3 consecutive days on, followed by 4 consecutive days off. Long-term use of topical steroids can lead to secondary infection with fungus or bacteria (see tinea incognito), skin atrophy, telangiectasia (prominent blood vessels), skin bruising and fragility.

The use of the finger tip unit may be helpful in guiding how much topical steroid is required to cover different areas of the body.

== Adverse effects ==
- Hypothalamic–pituitary–adrenal axis (HPA) suppression
- Cushing's syndrome
- Diabetes mellitus
- Osteoporosis
- Topical steroid addiction
- Allergic contact dermatitis (see steroid allergy)
- Steroid atrophy
- Perioral dermatitis: This is a rash that occurs around the mouth and the eye region that has been associated with topical steroids.
- Ocular effects: Topical steroid drops are frequently used after eye surgery but can also raise intraocular pressure (IOP) and increase the risk of glaucoma, cataract, retinopathy as well as systemic adverse effects.
- Tachyphylaxis: The acute development of tolerance to the action of a drug after repeated doses. Significant tachyphylaxis can occur by day 4 of therapy. Recovery usually occurs after 3 to 4 days' rest. This has led to therapies such as 3 days on, 4 days off; or one week on therapy, and one week off therapy.
- Delivery-related adverse effects
- Other local adverse effects: These include facial hypertrichosis, folliculitis, miliaria, genital ulcers, and granuloma gluteale infantum. Long-term use has resulted in Norwegian scabies, Kaposi's sarcoma, and other unusual dermatosis.

== Safety in pregnancy ==
Using topical steroids as intended during pregnancy is safe and does not cause miscarriage, birth defects or any pregnancy-related problems.

== Classification systems ==
=== Seven-class System ===
The U.S. utilizes 7 classes, which are classified by their ability to constrict capillaries and cause skin blanching. Class I is the strongest, or superpotent. Class VII is the weakest and mildest.

==== Class I ====
Very potent: up to 600 times stronger than hydrocortisone

- Clobetasol propionate 0.05% (Dermovate)
- Betamethasone dipropionate 0.25% (Diprolene)
- Halobetasol propionate 0.05% (Ultravate, Halox)
- Diflorasone diacetate 0.05% (Psorcon)

==== Class II ====
- Fluocinonide 0.05% (Lidex)
- Halcinonide 0.05% (Halog)
- Amcinonide 0.05% (Cyclocort)
- Desoximetasone 0.25% (Topicort)

==== Class III ====
- Triamcinolone acetonide 0.5% (Kenalog, Aristocort cream)
- Mometasone furoate 0.1% (Elocon, Elocom ointment)
- Fluticasone propionate 0.005% (Cutivate)
- Betamethasone dipropionate 0.05% (Diprosone)
- Halometasone 0.05%

==== Class IV ====
- Fluocinolone acetonide 0.01–0.2% (Synalar, Synemol, Fluonid)
- Hydrocortisone valerate 0.2% (Westcort)
- Hydrocortisone butyrate 0.1% (Locoid)
- Flurandrenolide 0.05% (Cordran)
- Triamcinolone acetonide 0.1% (Kenalog, Aristocort A ointment)
- Mometasone furoate 0.1% (Elocon cream, lotion)

==== Class V ====
- Fluticasone propionate 0.05% (Cutivate cream)
- Desonide 0.05% (Tridesilon, DesOwen ointment)
- Fluocinolone acetonide 0.025% (Synalar, Synemol cream)
- Hydrocortisone valerate 0.2% (Westcort cream)

==== Class VI ====
- Alclometasone dipropionate 0.05% (Aclovate cream, ointment)
- Triamcinolone acetonide 0.025% (Aristocort A cream, Kenalog lotion)
- Fluocinolone acetonide 0.01% (Capex shampoo, Dermasmooth)
- Desonide 0.05% (DesOwen cream, lotion)

==== Class VII ====
The weakest class of topical steroids. Has poor lipid permeability, and can not penetrate mucous membranes well.

- Hydrocortisone 2.5% (Hytone cream, lotion, ointment)
- Hydrocortisone 1% (Many over-the-counter brands)

=== Five-class System ===
Japan rates topical steroids from 1 to 5, with 1 being strongest.

=== Four-class System ===
Many countries, such as the United Kingdom, Germany, the Netherlands, New Zealand, recognize 4 classes. In the United Kingdom and New Zealand I is the strongest, while in Continental Europe, class IV is regarded as the strongest.

==== Class IV (UK/NZ: class I) ====
Very potent (up to 600 times as potent as hydrocortisone)

- Clobetasol propionate (Dermovate Cream/Ointment, Exel Cream)
- Betamethasone dipropionate (Diprosone OV Cream/Ointment, Diprovate Cream)

==== Class III (UK/NZ: class II) ====
Potent (50–100 times as potent as hydrocortisone)

- Betamethasone valerate (Beta Cream/Ointment/Scalp Application, Betnovate Lotion/C Cream/C Ointment, Fucicort)
- Betamethasone dipropionate (Diprosone Cream/Ointment, Diprovate Cream, Daivobet 50/500 Ointment)
- Diflucortolone valerate (Nerisone C/Cream/Fatty Ointment/Ointment)
- Hydrocortisone 17-butyrate (Locoid C/Cream/Crelo Topical Emulsion/Lipocream/Ointment/Scalp Lotion)
- Mometasone furoate (Elocon Cream/Lotion/Ointment)
- Methylprednisolone aceponate (Advantan Cream/Ointment)
- Halometasone 0.05%

==== Class II (UK/NZ: class III) ====
Moderate (2–25 times as potent as hydrocortisone)

- Clobetasone butyrate (Eumovate Cream)
- Triamcinolone acetonide (Aristocort Cream/Ointment, Viaderm KC Cream/Ointment, Kenacomb Ointment)

==== Class I (UK/NZ: class IV) ====
Mild

- Hydrocortisone 0.5–2.5% (DermAid Cream/Soft Cream, DP Lotion-HC 1%, Skincalm, Lemnis Fatty Cream HC, Pimafucort Cream/Ointment)

=== Allergy associations ===
The highlighted steroids are often used in the screening of allergies to topical steroid and systemic steroids. When one is allergic to one group, one is allergic to all steroids in that group.

==== Group A ====
Hydrocortisone, hydrocortisone acetate, cortisone acetate, tixocortol pivalate, prednisolone, methylprednisolone, and prednisone

==== Group B ====
Triamcinolone acetonide, triamcinolone alcohol, amcinonide, budesonide, desonide, fluocinonide, fluocinolone acetonide, and halcinonide

==== Group C ====
Betamethasone, betamethasone sodium phosphate, dexamethasone, dexamethasone sodium phosphate, and fluocortolone

==== Group D ====
Hydrocortisone 17-butyrate, hydrocortisone-17-valerate, alclometasone dipropionate, betamethasone valerate, betamethasone dipropionate, prednicarbate, clobetasone-17-butyrate, Clobetasol-17 propionate, fluocortolone caproate, fluocortolone pivalate, fluprednidene acetate, and mometasone furoate

== History ==
Corticosteroids were first made available for general use around 1950.

== See also ==
- Topical medication
- Glucocorticoid
- Corticosteroid
- Retrometabolic drug design
