= C25H36O6 =

The molecular formula C_{25}H_{36}O_{6} (molar mass: 432.54 g/mol, exact mass: 432.251189 u) may refer to:

- Coicenal C
- Hydrocortisone 17-butyrate
- Hydrocortisone 21-butyrate
- Pseudopterosin A
