= C26H32F2O7 =

The molecular formula C_{26}H_{32}F_{2}O_{7} (molar mass: 494.52 g/mol, exact mass: 494.21161) may refer to:

- Diflorasone diacetate
- Fluocinonide
