= Atrophoderma =

Dermatologic terminology

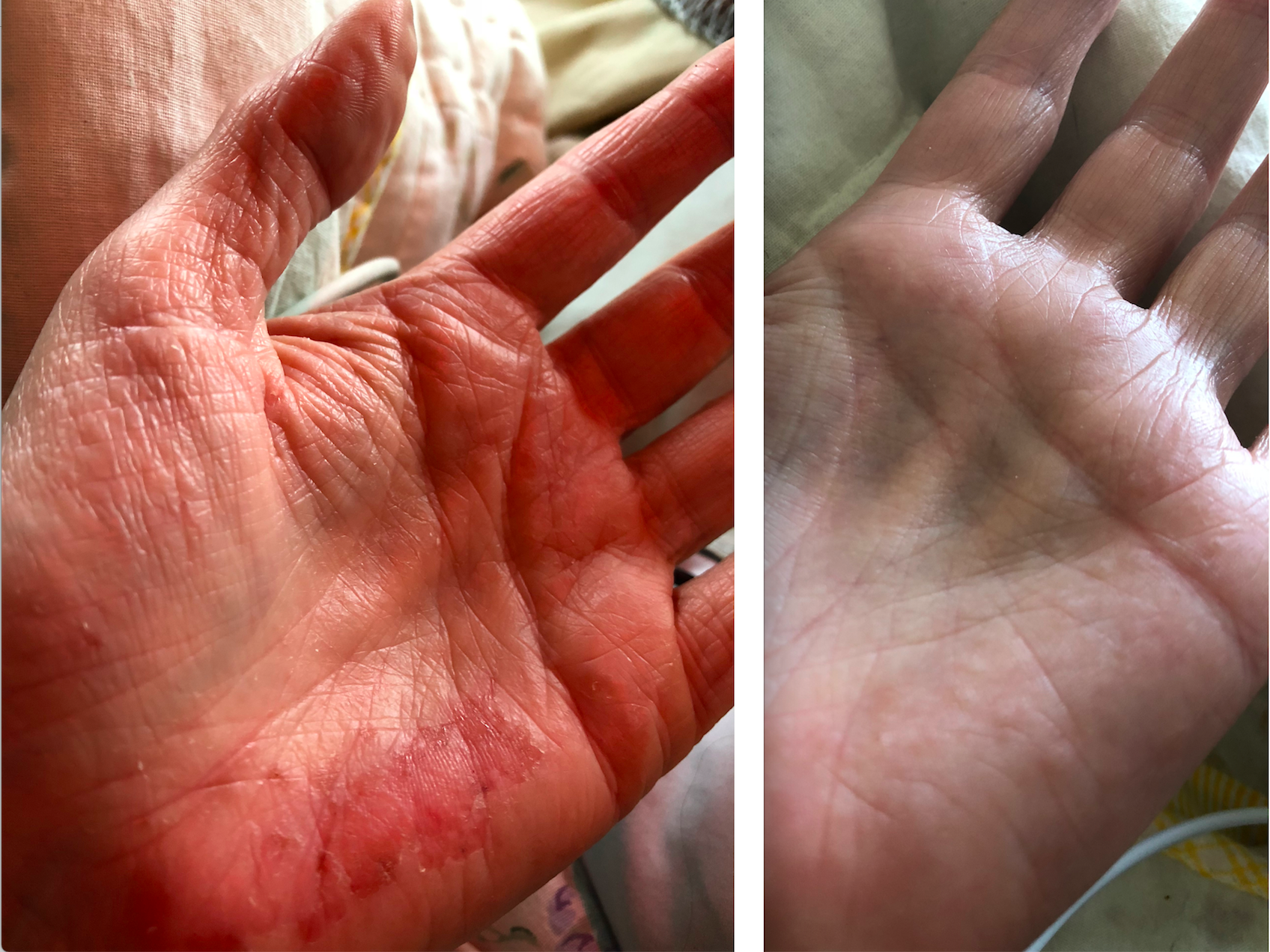
- Atrophy caused by topical corticosteroids.
- Specialty: Dermatology

Atrophoderma refers to conditions involving thinning of skin.

Types include:

- Follicular atrophoderma
- Steroid-induced skin atrophy
- Linear atrophoderma of Moulin
- Atrophoderma of Pasini and Pierini
