= C20H30O3 =

The molecular formula C_{20}H_{30}O_{3} (molar mass: 318.457 g/mol) may refer to:

- Coicenal A
- Coicenal D
- Dihydrotestosterone formate
- Eoxin A4
- Epoxyeicosatetraenoic acid
- Galanolactone
- Leukotriene A4
- 9-Nor-9β-hydroxyhexahydrocannabinol
- Neotripterifordin
- 5-oxo-eicosatetraenoic acid
- Oxymesterone
- Steviol
