= Granular parakeratosis =

Skin condition

- Specialty: Dermatology

Granular parakeratosis, also known as axillary granular parakeratosis, intertriginous granular parakeratosis, and zombie patch is a cutaneous condition characterized by brownish-red keratotic papules that can coalesce into plaques.

== Signs and symptoms ==
Granular parakeratosis frequently affects the folds and is characterized by erythema with variable degrees of hyperpigmentation. In certain people, it may also be significantly pruritic.

== Causes ==
The exact cause of granular parakeratosis is unclear. The majority of reports elaborate links with skin maceration (due to occlusion, warm surroundings, perspiration, obesity, and recurrent washing) or skin irritation from external chemicals (eg, antiperspirants, deodorants, and zinc oxide). It appears to be a reactive process in the skin. In case reports, exposure to benzalkonium chloride—a preservative and antiseptic used in a wide range of goods, such as medical treatments, laundry rinses, and wipes—has been suggested as a trigger. There have also been reports of granular parakeratosis developing after using a depilatory lotion.

== Diagnosis ==
Granular parakeratosis skin biopsies reveal compact parakeratosis and hyperkeratosis in the stratum corneum. The characteristic feature of the illness is the presence of basophilic keratohyalin granules in cells in the higher layers of the skin. Most frequently, papillomatosis or an acanthotic pattern of thickening of the epidermis occurs with or without psoriasis. There may also be a low-grade lymphohistiocytic infiltration.

== Treatment ==
After stopping the stimulant, some people heal on their own. Oral isotretinoin, antimicrobial medications, topical glucocorticoids, tretinoin, and vitamin D3 derivatives have also been reported to be beneficial. Additionally, successful treatments with freezing, injections of botulinum toxin, and the combination of Nd: YAG and CO_{2} fractional laser therapy have been reported.

== See also ==
- Pityriasis rubra pilaris
- List of cutaneous conditions
