= C24H34O6 =

The molecular formula C_{24}H_{34}O_{6} may refer to:

- Coicenal B
- Mexrenoic acid
