= TSW =

TSW may refer to:

- Tactical Support Wing, a unit of the United States Navy
- Team Secret Whales, an esports team formed by the partnership of Team Secret and Team Whales
- Television South West, the ITV franchise holder for the South West England region from 1 January 1982 until 31 December 1992
- The Secret World, a 2012 MMORPG from developer Funcom
- Tin Shui Wai, a town located in the northwestern part of the New Territories, Hong Kong, in Yuen Long District
- Topical steroid withdrawal
- Trader's and Scheduler's Workbench, Oil & Gas functionality for SAP ERP
- Train Sim World, a series of video games from Dovetail Games
- Tsuen Wan station, Hong Kong; MTR station code
