= C28H37ClO7 =

The molecular formula C_{28}H_{37}ClO_{7} (molar mass: 521.04 g/mol, exact mass: 520.2228 u) may refer to:

- Alclometasone dipropionate
- Beclometasone, or beclometasone dipropionate
