= C23H32O6 =

The molecular formula C_{23}H_{32}O_{6} (molar mass: 404.50 g/mol, exact mass: 404.2199 u) may refer to:

- Hydrocortisone acetate
- k-Strophanthidin
