= Cortisol O-acetyltransferase =

Enzyme

Identifiers
- EC no.: 2.3.1.27
- CAS no.: 9076-48-6

Databases
- IntEnz: IntEnz view
- BRENDA: BRENDA entry
- ExPASy: NiceZyme view
- KEGG: KEGG entry
- MetaCyc: metabolic pathway
- PRIAM: profile
- PDB structures: RCSB PDB PDBe PDBsum
- Gene Ontology: AmiGO / QuickGO
Search
- PMC: articles
- PubMed: articles
- NCBI: proteins

Cortisol O-acetyltransferase (EC 2.3.1.27) is an enzyme that was characterised from baboon brain and catalyzes a chemical reaction that converts the steroid hormone, cortisol, to a specific O-acetyl derivative.

cortisol
+
acetyl-CoA
hydrocortisone acetate
+ coenzyme A

The two substrates of this enzyme are cortisol and acetyl-CoA. Its products are hydrocortisone acetate and coenzyme A.

This enzyme belongs to the family of transferases, specifically those acyltransferases transferring groups other than aminoacyl groups. The systematic name of this enzyme class is acetyl-CoA:cortisol O-acetyltransferase. Other names in common use include cortisol acetyltransferase, corticosteroid acetyltransferase, and corticosteroid-21-O-acetyltransferase.
