= Amcinonide =

Chemical compound

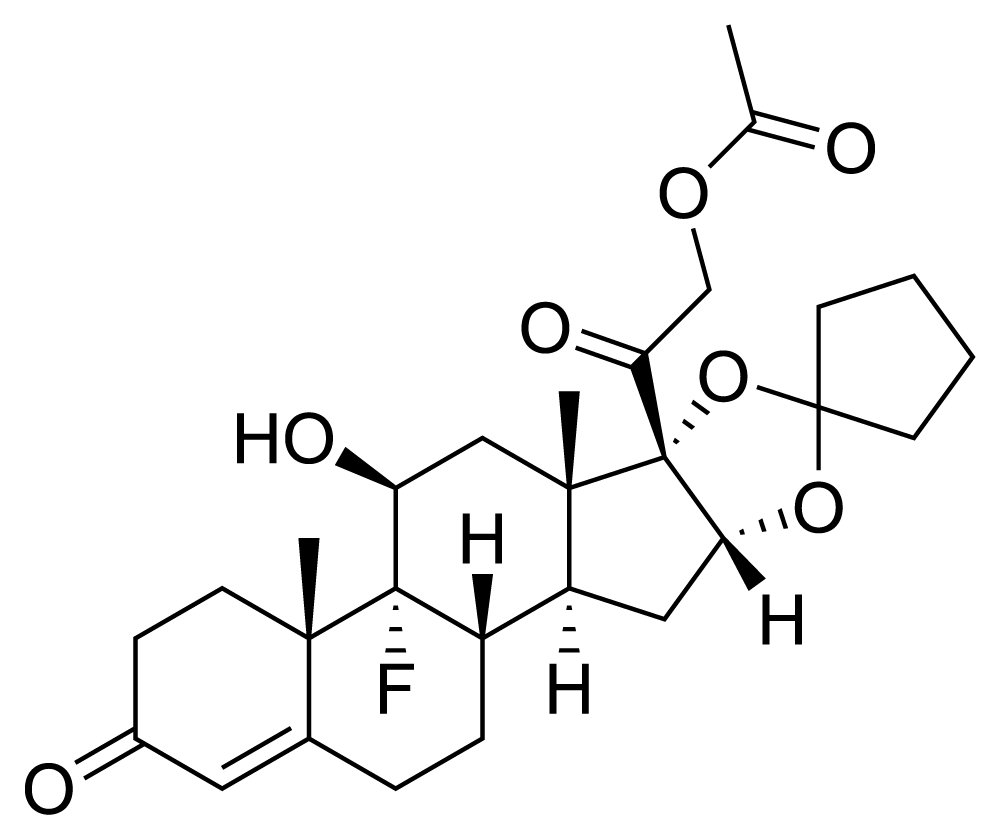

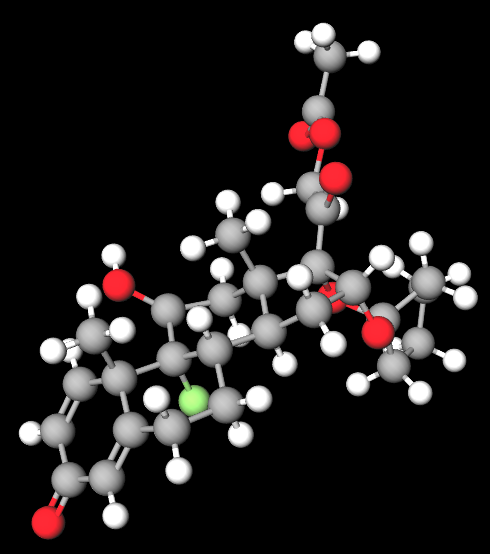

Clinical data
- Trade names: Cyclocort
- AHFS/Drugs.com: Micromedex Detailed Consumer Information
- Routes of administration: Topical
- ATC code: D07AC11 (WHO)

Legal status
- Legal status: US: ℞-only

Pharmacokinetic data
- Metabolism: Hepatic
- Excretion: Urine and bile

Identifiers
- IUPAC name: 2-[(1S,2S,4R,8S,9S,11S,12R,13S)-12'-fluoro-11'-hydroxy-9',13'-dimethyl-16'-oxo-5',7'-dioxaspiro[cyclopentane-1,6'-pentacyclo[10.8.0.0^{2,9}.0^{4,8}.0^{13,18}]icosane]-14',17'-dien-8'-yl]-2-oxoethyl acetate
- CAS Number: 51022-69-6
- PubChem CID: 443958
- IUPHAR/BPS: 7060
- DrugBank: DB00288
- ChemSpider: 392009
- UNII: 423W026MA9
- KEGG: D01387
- ChEBI: CHEBI:31199
- ChEMBL: ChEMBL1200732
- CompTox Dashboard (EPA): DTXSID6045905
- ECHA InfoCard: 100.051.724

Chemical and physical data
- Formula: C_{28}H_{35}FO_{7}
- Molar mass: 502.579 g·mol^{−1}
- 3D model (JSmol): Interactive image
- Density: 1.33 g/cm^{3}
- Boiling point: 635.9 °C (1,176.6 °F)
- SMILES: O=C(OCC(=O)[C@]45OC6(O[C@@H]5C[C@@H]2[C@@]4(C[C@H](O)[C@]3(F)[C@]/1(/C=C\C(=O)\C=C\1CC[C@@H]23)C)C)CCCC6)C
- InChI: InChI=1S/C28H35FO7/c1-16(30)34-15-22(33)28-23(35-26(36-28)9-4-5-10-26)13-20-19-7-6-17-12-18(31)8-11-24(17,2)27(19,29)21(32)14-25(20,28)3/h8,11-12,19-21,23,32H,4-7,9-10,13-15H2,1-3H3/t19-,20-,21-,23+,24-,25-,27-,28+/m0/s1; Key:ILKJAFIWWBXGDU-MOGDOJJUSA-N

Amcinonide (trade name Cyclocort) is a topical glucocorticoid used to treat itching, redness and swelling associated with several dermatologic conditions such as atopic dermatitis and allergic contact dermatitis. Amcinonide can also be classified as a multi-functional small molecule corticosteroid, which has been approved by the FDA and is currently marketed as an ointment, lotion, or cream. It acts as both a transcription factor for responses to glucocorticoids and modulator for other transcription factors while also regulating phospholipase A2 activity.

== Medical Uses ==
Corticosteroids applied topically are used for the relief of the inflammatory and pruritic manifestations of corticosteroid-responsive dermatoses, particularly dermatitis, eczema, and psoriasis. Cyclocort's active ingredient is Amcinonide, with inactive ingredients including petrolatum, benzyl alcohol, sorbitol, butylated hydroxyanisole, propyl gallate, citric acid, glycerin, and/ or propylene glycol. The specific inactive ingredients used depend on the dosage form (ointment, area, or lotion) and help the product retain its chemical and physical integrity while increasing the shelf-life.

=== Dermatitis, Psoriasis, & Eczema ===
0.1% Amcinonide cream or ointment is typically applied two to three times daily to treat dermatitis, psoriasis, and/ or eczema while the same strength lotion is usually only used twice daily. This information can be found on the FDA approved label or from the prescribing doctor or pharmacist. Occlusive dressings may be used to supplement Amcinonide treatment, particularly when treating psoriasis.

== Adverse Effects ==
Amcinonide exhibits side effects common among other corticosteroids. While these reactions are uncommon for most delivery vehicles, the use of occlusive dressings increases the likelihood of such effects. These include burning, itching, skin dryness and irritation, acne/ pimples, skin atrophy, blistering, and/ or skin discoloration. While most side effects are mild, a medical professional should be contacted if severe rash, acne, skin deterioration, excessive hair growth, or abnormal weight gain occur. Following package insert instructions for a single topical dose, as detailed on the package insert, should not lead to any toxicities.

== Pharmacology ==
Cyclocort is a synthetic corticosteroid created to imitate natural glucocorticoids. In order to do so, amcinonide acts as an agonist to target glucocorticoid receptors. After interacting with the receptor, endocytosis occurs at which point the drug can bind to DNA within the cell. Gene expression is subsequently modified to produce anti-inflammatory mediators while preventing the formation of inflammatory agents thus reducing overall inflammation and immune system response.

=== Mechanism of Action ===
The mechanism by which Amcinonide causes anti-inflammatory responses is unclear with current research focused on similar topical steroids that may possess the same mechanism. This is thought to occur via the induction of lipocortin (phospholipase A2 inhibitor proteins). Ongoing research predicts that Amcinonide prevents the release of arachidonic acid which, in turn, stops the synthesis of the inflammation mediators prostaglandins and leukotrienes. Phospholipase A2 normally causes membrane phospholipids to release arachidonic acid, therefore causing a cascade of reactions leading to inflammation of the skin. Due to Amcinonide's high affinity for the glucocorticoid receptor, a neuroactive ligand-receptor interaction occurs and the initial acid release is inhibited, thus helping to alleviate any itching/ burning symptoms.

=== Metabolism & Elimination ===
Amcinonide undergoes transdermal absorption with pharmacokinetic profiles similar to that of other corticosteroids administered systematically. Metabolism occurs mainly in the liver and its hepatic cells. The metabolized compound is predominately filtered through the kidneys and excreted in urine although a small amount is excreted in the bile.

== History ==
Amcinonide was first developed in the United Kingdom in the 1960s and 1970s before being patented by the American Cyanamid company. Lederle Laboratories, most famous for the discovery of the antibacterial tetracycline drug class, began to manufacture of Amcinonide before being acquired by Cyanamid. In 1994, American Cyanamid and its Lederle Lab division was purchased by American Home Products (AHP) before eventually changing the company's name to Wyeth Pharmaceuticals in 2002. Wyeth Pharma was eventually purchased by rival Pfizer in 2009 for $68 billion although the manufacture of Amcinonide has since been discontinued by the company.

=== Research & Clinical Trials ===
Amcinonide is produced from the reaction of 16α,17α-Cyciopentylidenedioxy-9α-fluoro-11β,21-dihydroxy-1,4pregnadiene-3,20-dione and acetic anhydride in which 11.1g and 5.5mL, respectively, of each reactant are consumed to produce 7.0g of pure product. Only 4.7% of patients in clinical trials reported experiencing side effects as a result of continued use of Amcinonide. Specifically, in one acceptability study conducted on a weekly basis, one-fifth of patients using both placebo and Cyclocort 0.1% lotion reported various discomforts at multiple interviews. The outcomes of relevant trials are included below.

One of the initial clinical studies into Amcinonide, conducted by Woodford & Barry, 1979, compared topical applications Amcinonide to Triamcinolone Acetonide. Specifically, 0.1% strength preparations of each compound were tested against 0.025% Synalar Gel and 0.1% Betnovate Cream using a vasoconstrictor assay to determine bioavailability and anti-inflammatory effects. All formulations had similar bioavailability profiles with the peak of the curve coming approximately 12 hours after topical administration and covering with an occlusive dressing. Concluding, the study found Amcinonide cream to be the most effective with the highest bio-activity and area under the curve (pharmacokinetics).

A French study by Binet et al., 1979, compared 0.1% Amcinonide ointment to equal strength Fluocinonide ointment, a similar corticosteroid already on the market. A double-blind comparative analysis was conducted to determine if Amcinonide was bioequivalent for the treatment of psoriasis and eczema. Each group contained both males and females of varying ages (mean = 54.8) and compared objective criteria (crust, scales, swelling, etc.) and subjective criteria (itching, burning, pain). It was found that treatment of dermatitis with Amcinonide achieved significant improvement over the one-week trial period, thus demonstrating adequate efficacy in treating psoriasis, eczema, and even parapsoriasis.

Similar to the Woodford & Barry study in 1977, Woodford & Haigh, 1979 sought to determine the potency of 0.1% Amcinonide through the use of a vasoconstrictor assay. Three equal strength formulations of Amcinonide were prepared (cream, combination-ointment, combination-cream) were compared against similar corticosteroids already on the market in the United Kingdom (Betnovate, Metosyn, Synalar, Temetex, Dermovate, and Halciderm). It was found that 0.1% Amcinonide cream was significantly more bio-active than other 'potent' classified drugs and was subsequently assigned to the 'very potent' category, as established by the UK MIMS potency classification system. Amcinonide cream was also determined to be bioequivalent to other proprietary corticosteroids on the English market.

In a study conducted by Fedler, Pilz, & Frosch, 1993, the long term usage of Amcinonide, along with other topical corticosteroids, was tested on women with a history of dermatitis who had otherwise been relatively healthy. It was found that corticosteroid usage may eventually cause erythematous reactions and spreading hives. The study concluded that contact allergies may be developed, in some cases, when using Amcinonide to treat chronic dermatitis. These findings should be considered when treating dermatological conditions with multiple corticosteroids, including Amcinonide.

=== Commercialization ===
First introduced to the market in 1979 as 0.025% and 0.1% creams, Amcinonide has been available continuously since then, being prescribed for a variety of similar dermatological symptoms. Lederle Laboratories first manufactured Amcinonide for distribution to countries in North America, Europe, and Asia. In 1979, marketed under the trade name of Cyclocort, Amcinonide was made available in the United States. Also produced by American Cyanamid, Amcinonide was then marketed to West Germany as Amcinonid beginning in 1981. Shortly thereafter in 1982, Lederle introduced the product to France and Japan as Visderm and Penticort, respectively.

After acquiring production rights from American Home Products, Amcinonide is currently being produced in the United States by Taro Pharmaceuticals USA and Fougera, a subsidiary of Sandoz and Novartis. GlaxoSmithKline and Teva Canada also produce Amcinonide for international sales. While most products are manufactured at 0.1% strength ointment, cream, or lotion, none of the producers sell Amcinonide as an over-the-counter (OTC) medication but only as a prescription product.

While the initial patents obtained by American Cyanamid company in the late 1970s/ early 1980s for ointment, cream, and lotion formulations have expired, new patents have been obtained for alternative transdermal delivery methods. More recently, however, the drug formulation itself has not been patented but ways to incorporate it into occlusive dressings such as a pressure sensitive adhesive layer as demonstrated by Senju USA, Inc. in 2012 - 2014. Specifically, these new dosage forms target diseases of the eyelid such as blepharitis, allergic conjunctivitis, vernal keratoconjunctivitis, and atopic keratoconjunctivitis. This is significant as previous formulations of Amcinonide have not been used to treat ocular inflammations. Patents such as these are likely to continue to be published as research searches for low cost alternatives to new drugs to increase bioavailability and patient compliance.

==== Regulatory ====
Taro Pharmaceuticals obtained FDA approval to begin production of Amcinonide cream in 2002 after proving the product was bioequivalent to Cyclocort products already on the market. This was the first generic Amcinonide product to be sold in the United States, thus introducing a lower-priced alternative for patients with applicable dermatological ailments. In 2003, Fougera Pharmaceutical became the main competitor to Taro after acquiring FDA approval for production of 0.1% Amcinonide cream.

In 2009, Taro Pharmaceuticals was warned by the FDA that they were not meeting good manufacturing practices for their ointment and that their final product was non-sterile. Following additional FDA investigations, this was eventually resolved after two years, at which point the company regained good standing with FDA regulations.
