= Intravitreal implants =

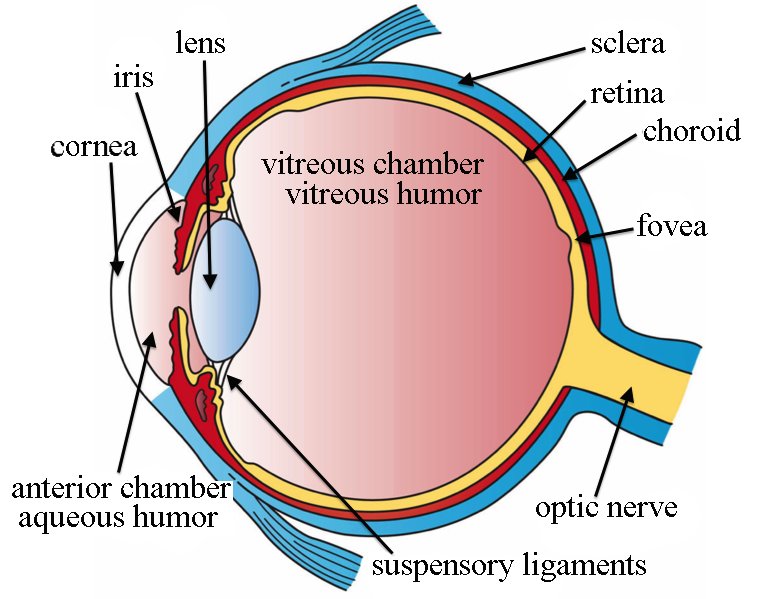
Anatomical diagram of a human eye

Intravitreal implants are micro device-like inserts injected into the posterior segment of the eye to treat retinal diseases releasing therapeutic drugs at a set rate over a desired period of time. The posterior segment of the eye consists of the sclera, choroid, fovea, vitreous humor, optic nerve, and retina.

== Applications ==
=== Non-biodegradable implants ===
Inserts made with non-biodegradable materials such as polymers require a surgical removal of the implant after the end of the treatment period. Examples of these materials consist of polymers such as ethylene-vinyl acetate (EVA), polyvinyl alcohol (PVA), polyurethane (PU) and poly siloxane (PS). An advantage to these non-biodegradable implants is that they do not cause any immune response towards the retina and the release of the drug substance can be controlled by "layering polymers of different permeability."

- Fluocinolone acetonide (Iluvien)

=== Biodegradable implants ===
Biodegradable implants are made of materials, typically, either water-soluble or metabolizable to degrade into un-harmful byproducts which can be safely excreted by the human body. The release of the therapeutic drug is determined by the degradation of the implant and the diffusion rate of the drug substance. Indicating that the higher the molecular weight of the polymer and drug substance used, the slower the release of the drug into the vitreous humor.

- Dexamethasone (Ozurdex)
- Bimatoprost (Durysta)
