= Steroid-induced skin atrophy =

Skin thinning due to prolonged exposure to topical steroids

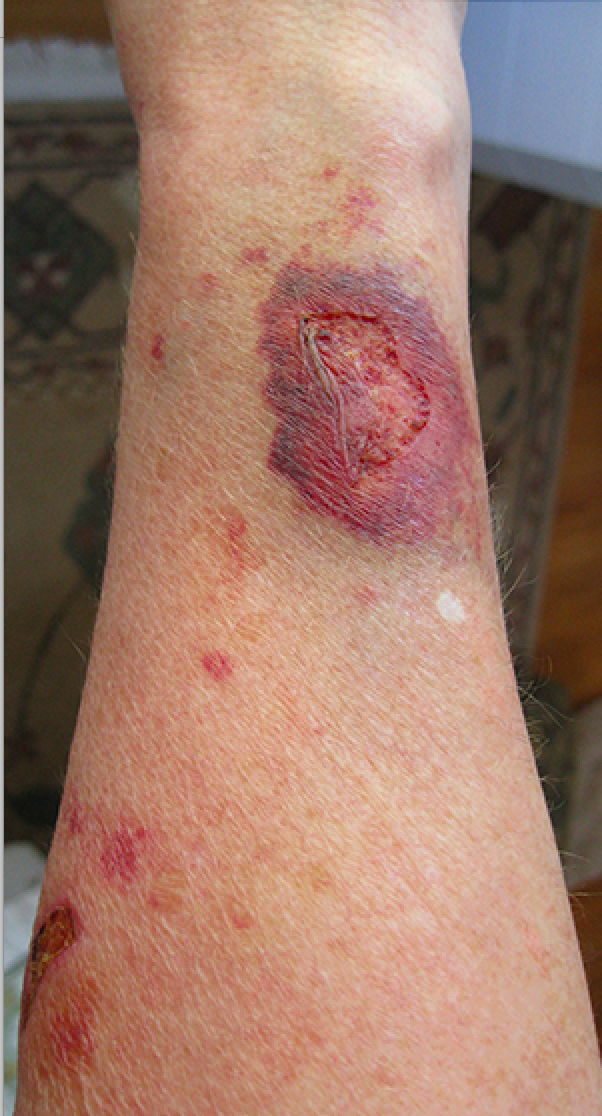
- Skin atrophy
- Specialty: Dermatology
- Symptoms: telangiectasias, purpura, striae, hypopigmentation
- Complications: Possible HPA axis involvement
- Usual onset: within the first 7 days of daily superpotent TCS application under occlusion, within 2 weeks of daily use of less potent TCS or superpotent TCS without occlusion.
- Causes: Changes in gene regulation and transcription of various mRNA
- Risk factors: higher potency corticosteroids, more frequent application, extended duration of treatment, use of occlusion, infancy/childhood, location
- Diagnostic method: Visual inspection of skin for visible signs of skin atrophy
- Prevention: Intermittent maintenance therapy; increasing duration of interval between applications
- Management: Discontinuation of treatment
- Prognosis: Most signs of atrophy resolve by 1 to 4 weeks after discontinuation of the TCS; striae are permanent
- Frequency: up to 5% after a year of use (in psoriasis)

Steroid-induced skin atrophy is thinning of the skin at the level of the epidermis as a result of prolonged exposure to topical steroids. This is the most common side effect of overuse or misuse of topical steroids. Topical steroids are typically prescribed for psoriasis, atopic dermatitis (eczema), and other itchy rashes. In people with psoriasis using topical steroids it occurs in up to 5% of people after a year of use. Intermittent use of topical steroids for atopic dermatitis is safe and does not cause skin thinning.

Skin atrophy can occur with both prescription and over the counter steroids. Potency of the topical steroid will influence its propensity to cause skin atrophy. Oral prednisone and intralesional steroids may also result in atrophied skin. Alternatives to topical steroids are available, depending on skin condition, with a reduced and different side effect profile.

== Signs and symptoms ==
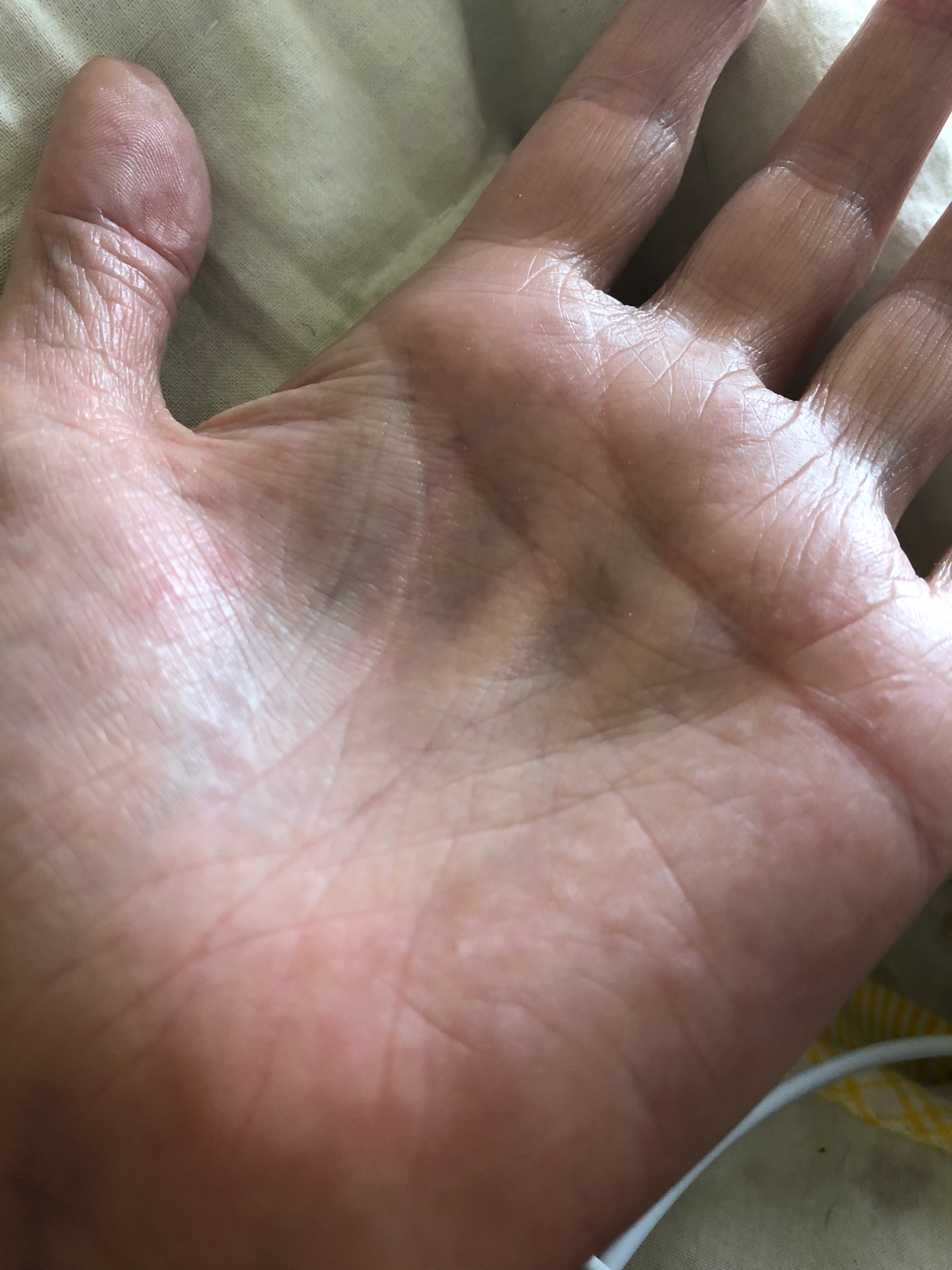
Steroid-induced atrophy

Skin atrophy typically presents as thin, shiny skin. Wrinkling of the skin and erythema may also be observed. In lighter skin tones, erythema presents as bright red, while darker skin tones appear more dark brown.

Once atrophy develops, further and deeper topical steroid side effects may occur, such as telangiectasia, easy bruising, purpura, and striae.

Intralesional steroids may result in an indentation at the site of injection.

== Diagnosis ==
Steroid-induced skin atrophy is a clinical diagnosis that is aided by patient history. A correlation between start of steroid application and presentation of side effects may be deduced. Key patient history features include amount of steroid applied, frequency and length of application, and location. An important distinction between a systemic versus external cause of skin conditions is symmetry and definition. Clues for an external cause include well-defined borders in the area of steroid application, as well as asymmetry. These physical findings support topical steroid etiology.

== Treatment ==
The mainstay of steroid-induced skin atrophy treatment is immediate discontinuation of any further topical corticosteroid use. Protection and support of the impaired skin barrier is another priority. This can be achieved with utilizing gentle lotions, creams, and/or occlusives to restore the skin barrier. Eliminating harsh skin regimens or products will be necessary to minimize potential for further purpura or trauma, skin sensitivity, and potential infection.

=== Alternative treatment ===
Development of alternative treatment with less side effects are available. This secondary treatment may also be considered if treatment of the skin condition is refractory to topical steroids. Other treatment choices will depend on the skin condition being treated.

==== Atopic Dermatitis ====
Topical steroids are the primary treatment of choice for atopic dermatitis. However, topical immunomodulators (tacrolimus, pimecrolimus) and biologics are available options. The mechanism of these alternatives target a different pathway than topical steroids, which help reduce side effects.

==== Psoriasis ====
Topical treatment with steroids are effective in most cases of mild psoriasis. In cases refractory to topical steroids or in the presence of steroid side effects, topical vitamin D anologues (calcipotriol, calcipotriene) have shown to be effective. Off-label use of topical calcineurin inhibitors (tacrolimus, pimecrolimus) is also available with lesser known efficacy.

== Prognosis ==
Steroid-induced skin atrophy is often permanent, though if caught soon enough and the topical corticosteroid discontinued in time, the degree of damage may be arrested or slightly improve. If cessation of topical steroid occurs while side effects are only at the level of the epidermis, these effects can be reversible. Deeper dermal damage is often irreversible. Dermal damage is typically marked by telangiectasias and stretch marks. However, while the accompanying telangiectasias may improve marginally, the stretch marks are permanent and irreversible.

== Exacerbating factors ==
Common factors that increase the risk of skin thinning with steroid use include the following:

1. Applying too much steroid to the area of treatment
2. Using topical steroids for extended periods (>14–21 days)
3. Applying topical steroids to intertriginous areas such as the armpits, under the breasts, or on the groin
4. Using occlusive dressings, such as bandages, band aids, and clothing
5. Age (infancy/childhood, elderly)

== Prevention ==
=== Finger-tip unit ===
Education on proper application and signs of steroid side effects are important in preventing permanent side effects. The fingertip unit (FTU) is a concept used to standardize amount of steroid applied per area of affected skin. One FTU is approximately 0.5 grams of medication that covers 2% of body surface area. It is defined as the amount of medication dispensed from the tip of the finger to the distal interphalangeal joint. Recommended FTU in a single application is determined by location of affected skin. The face and neck requires 2.5 fingertip units, the front trunk 7 fingertip units, the back trunk 7 fingertip units, one arm 3 fingertip units, one hand (front and back) 1 fingertip unit, one leg 6 fingertip units, and one foot 2 fingertip units.

=== Caution with high-potency steroid application ===
Strong steroids should be avoided on sensitive sites such as the face, inframammary folds, groin, and armpits. Application of weak steroids to these areas should be limited to less than two weeks of continuous use. In general, use a potent preparation short term and weaker preparation for maintenance between flare-ups.

=== Pulse therapy ===
While there is no proven best benefit-to-risk ratio, if prolonged use of a topical steroid is required, pulse therapy can be used as a mechanism to prevent side effects. Pulse therapy refers to the application of a corticosteroid for 2 or 3 consecutive days each week or two. This is useful for maintaining control of chronic diseases. Generally a milder topical steroid or non-steroid treatment is used on the in-between days.

=== Weekend treatment in atopic dermatitis ===
For treating atopic dermatitis, newer (second generation) corticosteroids, such as fluticasone propionate and mometasone furoate, are more effective and safer than older steroid generations. They are also generally safe and do not cause skin thinning when used intermittently to treat atopic dermatitis flare-ups. They are also safe when used twice a week for preventing flares (also known as weekend treatment). Applying once daily is enough as it is as effective as twice or more daily application.

== Mechanism of action ==
Steroids have anti-inflammatory, anti-proliferative, and immunosuppressive effects that make it the mainstay of treatment for autoimmune and inflammatory conditions such as psoriasis and atopic dermatitis. Steroids bind intracellularly to their receptors found in the epidermis and dermis. Recent research has found transactivation of these receptors as a mechanism for steroid atrophy. Further research has shown the pathogenesis of skin atrophy is due to its inhibitory effects on key skin components at different levels of the skin. Keratinocyte proliferation is inhibited in the epidermis, while collagen 1 and 3 synthesis is halted at the dermis. Dermal atrophy intensifies with cessation of fibroblasts and hyaluronan synthase 3 enzyme leads because of decreased hyaluronic acid. Atrophic effects begin within 3–14 days of consistent topical steroid use and is first evident in the epidermal layer. Symptoms occurring at the level of epidermis are reversible. Prolonged use compromises the skin barrier integrity, which can cause dermal (more permanent) effects.

== Topical Steroid Classes ==
The strength of topical steroids is an important consideration in choosing a steroid to prescribe. Topical steroids are divided into classes based on potency. Low potency steroids (hydrocortisone, triamcinolone acetonide) may be used on any surface of the body and for a longer period (typically 1–2 weeks). Higher potency steroids (clobetasol, betamethasone) are reserved for severe pruritus that has been refractory to lower potency topical steroids. Higher potency steroids are used for a shorter periods to control exacerbations.

== See also ==
- Topical steroid withdrawal
- Corticosteroid
- Topical medication
