= Fluocinolone acetonide =

Corticosteroid anti-inflammatory drug

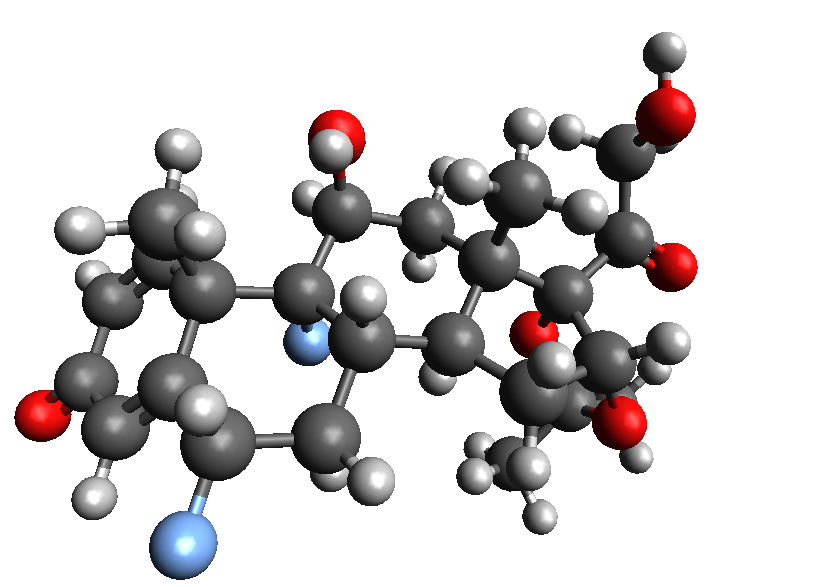

Clinical data
- Trade names: Synalar, others
- AHFS/Drugs.com: Monograph; Monograph
- Pregnancy category: AU: A
- Routes of administration: Topical, ophthalmic intravitreal injection
- ATC code: C05AA10 (WHO) D07AC04 (WHO) S01BA15 (WHO) S02BA08 (WHO)

Legal status
- Legal status: AU: S4 (Prescription only); CA: ℞-only; UK: POM (Prescription only); US: ℞-only; In general: ℞ (Prescription only)

Pharmacokinetic data
- Metabolism: Liver, CYP3A4-mediated
- Elimination half-life: 1.3 to 1.7 hours

Identifiers
- IUPAC name: (1S,2S,4R,8S,9S,11S,12R,13S,19S)-12,19-difluoro-11-hydroxy-8-(2-hydroxyacetyl)-6,6,9,13-tetramethyl-5,7-dioxapentacyclo[10.8.0.0^{2,9}.0^{4,8}.0^{13,18}]icosa-14,17-dien-16-one
- CAS Number: 67-73-2
- PubChem CID: 6215
- IUPHAR/BPS: 7077
- DrugBank: DB00591
- ChemSpider: 5980
- UNII: 0CD5FD6S2M
- KEGG: D01825
- ChEBI: CHEBI:31623
- ChEMBL: ChEMBL989
- CompTox Dashboard (EPA): DTXSID0040674
- ECHA InfoCard: 100.000.607

Chemical and physical data
- Formula: C_{24}H_{30}F_{2}O_{6}
- Molar mass: 452.495 g·mol^{−1}
- 3D model (JSmol): Interactive image
- SMILES: O=C\1\C=C5/[C@@](/C=C/1)(C)[C@]2(F)[C@H]([C@H]3[C@](C[C@@H]2O)([C@@]4(OC(O[C@@H]4C3)(C)C)C(=O)CO)C)C[C@@H]5F
- InChI: InChI=1S/C24H30F2O6/c1-20(2)31-19-9-13-14-8-16(25)15-7-12(28)5-6-21(15,3)23(14,26)17(29)10-22(13,4)24(19,32-20)18(30)11-27/h5-7,13-14,16-17,19,27,29H,8-11H2,1-4H3/t13-,14-,16-,17-,19+,21-,22-,23-,24+/m0/s1; Key:FEBLZLNTKCEFIT-VSXGLTOVSA-N

Fluocinolone acetonide is a fluorinated corticosteroid primarily used in dermatology to reduce skin inflammation and relieve itching. It is a synthetic hydrocortisone derivative. The fluorine substitution at position 9 in the steroid nucleus greatly enhances its activity. It was first synthesized in 1959 in the Research Department of Syntex Laboratories S.A. Mexico City. Preparations containing it were first marketed under the brand name Synalar.

Fluocinolone acetonide was also found to strongly potentiate TGF-β-associated chondrogenesis of bone marrow mesenchymal stem/progenitor cells, by increasing the levels of collagen type II by more than 100 fold compared to the widely used dexamethasone.

Fluocinolone acetonide intravitreal implants have been used to treat non-infectious uveitis. A systematic review could not determine with any confidence whether fluocinolone acetonide implants are superior to standard of care treatment for uveitis. A fluocinolone acetonide intravitreal implant with the brand name Iluvien is sold by biopharmaceutical company Alimera Sciences to treat diabetic macular edema.

It was approved for medical use in 1961.

== Classification ==
Fluocinolone is a group V (0.025%) or group VI (0.01%) corticosteroid under US classification.

== Brand names ==
Fluocinolone acetonide is available under the brand names Flucort-N, Iluvien, Synalar, Yutiq, and others.
