= Neotripterifordin =

Identifiers
CAS Number	149249-32-1
3D model (JSmol)	Interactive image
ChemSpider	8533973
PubChem CID	468899
- InChI: InChI=1S/C20H30O3/c1-17-7-3-8-20(16(21)23-12-17)14(17)6-9-19-10-13(4-5-15(19)20)18(2,22)11-19/h13-15,22H,3-12H2,1-2H3/t13-,14-,15-,17+,18-,19+,20+/m1/s1 Key: WAZWEQYFSTXTHA-BHJGDWCPSA-N
- SMILES: C[C@@]12CCC[C@@]3([C@@H]1CC[C@]45[C@H]3CC[C@H](C4)[C@](C5)(C)O)C(=O)OC2

Properties
Chemical formula	C_{20}H_{30}O_{3}
Molar mass	318.457 g·mol^{−1}
- Except where otherwise noted, data are given for materials in their standard state (at 25 °C [77 °F], 100 kPa). Infobox references

Neotripterifordin is an anti-viral diterpene lactone isolated from Tripterygium wilfordii.
