= Diflucortolone valerate =

Names
- IUPAC name 6α,9-Difluoro-11β-hydroxy-16α-methyl-3,20-dioxopregna-1,4-dien-21-yl pentanoate
- Systematic IUPAC name 2-[(1S,2R,3aS,3bS,5S,9aS,9bR,10S,11aS)-5,9b-Difluoro-10-hydroxy-2,9a,11a-trimethyl-7-oxo-2,3,3a,3b,4,5,7,9a,9b,10,11,11a-dodecahydro-1H-cyclopenta[a]phenanthren-1-yl]-2-oxoethyl pentanoate
- Other names Afusona; Diflucortolone 21-valerate

Identifiers
CAS Number	59198-70-8
3D model (JSmol)	Interactive image
ChEMBL	ChEMBL65702
ChemSpider	82773
DrugBank	DB09095
ECHA InfoCard	100.056.032
PubChem CID	91670
UNII	1A63Z067C8
CompTox Dashboard (EPA)	DTXSID1048598
- InChI: InChI=1S/C27H36F2O5/c1-5-6-7-23(33)34-14-21(31)24-15(2)10-17-18-12-20(28)19-11-16(30)8-9-26(19,4)27(18,29)22(32)13-25(17,24)3/h8-9,11,15,17-18,20,22,24,32H,5-7,10,12-14H2,1-4H3/t15-,17+,18+,20+,22+,24-,25+,26+,27+/m1/s1 Key: HHJIUUAMYGBVSD-YTFFSALGSA-N; InChI=1/C27H36F2O5/c1-5-6-7-23(33)34-14-21(31)24-15(2)10-17-18-12-20(28)19-11-16(30)8-9-26(19,4)27(18,29)22(32)13-25(17,24)3/h8-9,11,15,17-18,20,22,24,32H,5-7,10,12-14H2,1-4H3/t15-,17+,18+,20+,22+,24-,25+,26+,27+/m1/s1 Key: HHJIUUAMYGBVSD-YTFFSALGBY
- SMILES: O=C(OCC(=O)[C@@H]3[C@]2(C[C@H](O)[C@]4(F)[C@@]/1(\C(=C/C(=O)\C=C\1)[C@@H](F)C[C@H]4[C@@H]2C[C@H]3C)C)C)CCCC

Properties
Chemical formula	C_{27}H_{36}F_{2}O_{5}
Molar mass	478.577 g·mol^{−1}
Melting point	220 °C (428 °F; 493 K)
- Except where otherwise noted, data are given for materials in their standard state (at 25 °C [77 °F], 100 kPa). verify (what is ?) Infobox references

Diflucortolone valerate (also Nerisone cream/ointment/fatty ointment, Neriderm ointment, Japanese ジフルコルトロン (Jifurucorutoron)) is a corticosteroid rated Class 3 "potent" (100–150 times) in the New Zealand topical steroid system. It is a white to creamy white crystalline powder. It is practically insoluble in water, freely soluble in dichloromethane and in dioxan, sparingly soluble in ether and slightly soluble in methyl alcohol. Chemically, it is a corticosteroid esterified with valeric acid. It is commonly used topically in dermatology. The brand name is Nerisone; its creams come in potencies of 0.1% and 0.3%.

== See also ==
- Diflucortolone
