= Hydrocortisone 21-butyrate =

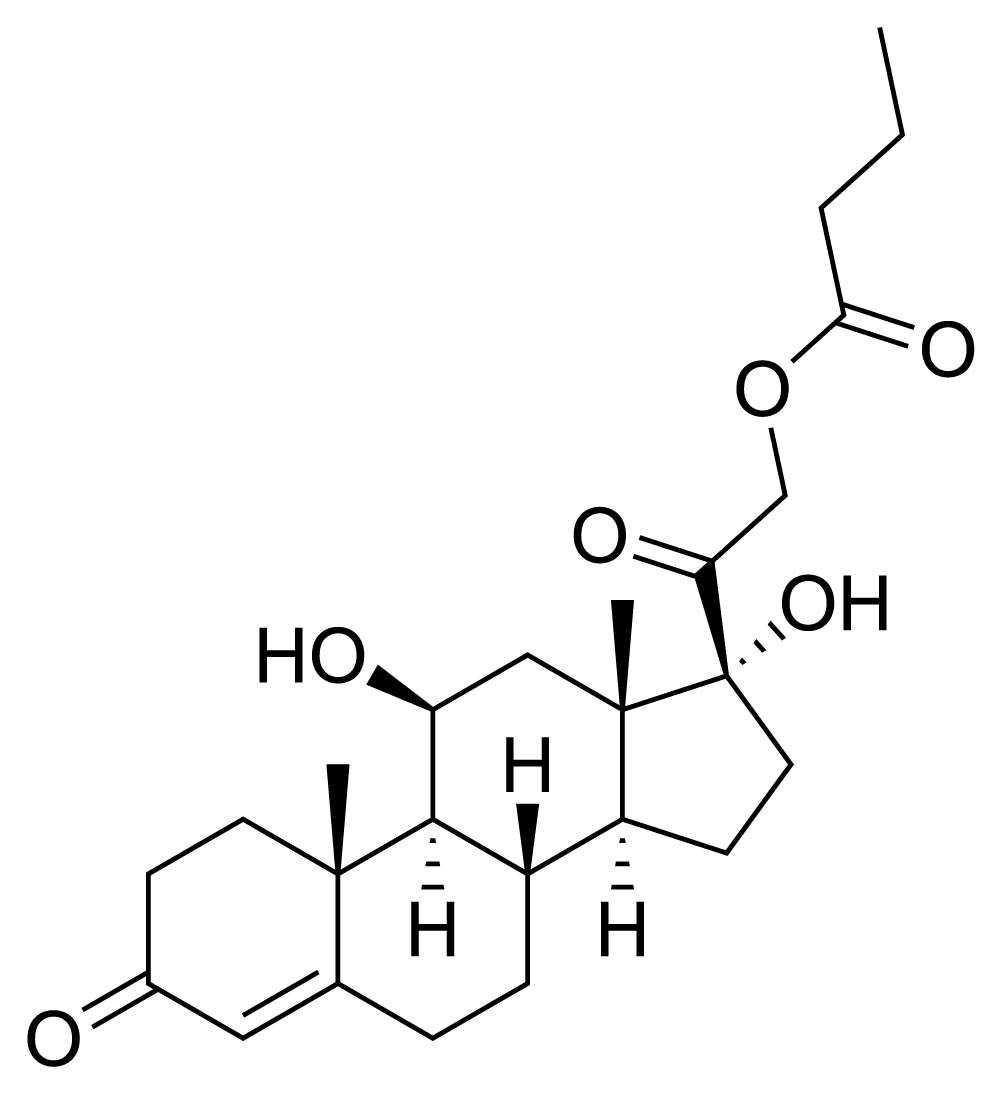

Names
- IUPAC name [2-[(8S,9S,10R,11S,13S,14S,17R)-11,17-dihydroxy-10,13-dimethyl-3-oxo-2,6,7,8,9,11,12,14,15,16-decahydro-1H-cyclopenta[a]phenanthren-17-yl]-2-oxoethyl] butanoate

Identifiers
CAS Number	6677-99-2
3D model (JSmol)	Interactive image
ChemSpider	21477349
ECHA InfoCard	100.027.015
PubChem CID	23144
UNII	XX86T7RLSC
CompTox Dashboard (EPA)	DTXSID00875538
- InChI: InChI=1S/C24H36O5/c1-4-5-20(27)29-14-24(28)11-9-18-17-7-6-15-12-16(25)8-10-22(15,2)21(17)19(26)13-23(18,24)3/h12,17-19,21,26,28H,4-11,13-14H2,1-3H3/t17-,18-,19-,21+,22-,23-,24-/m0/s1 Key: QVZHJTWKTBJCQR-GNSLJVCWSA-N; InChI=1/C24H36O5/c1-4-5-20(27)29-14-24(28)11-9-18-17-7-6-15-12-16(25)8-10-22(15,2)21(17)19(26)13-23(18,24)3/h12,17-19,21,26,28H,4-11,13-14H2,1-3H3/t17-,18-,19-,21+,22-,23-,24-/m0/s1 Key: QVZHJTWKTBJCQR-GNSLJVCWBJ
- SMILES: CCCC(=O)OCC1(CCC2C1(CC(C3C2CCC4=CC(=O)CCC34C)O)C)O

Properties
Chemical formula	C_{25}H_{36}O_{6}
Molar mass	432.55 g/mol
- Except where otherwise noted, data are given for materials in their standard state (at 25 °C [77 °F], 100 kPa). verify (what is ?) Infobox references

Hydrocortisone 21-butyrate is a form of hydrocortisone butyrate. It is a butyrate ester of hydrocortisone, with the butyrate group attached at the 21-position.

== See also ==
- Glucocorticoid
- Corticosteroid
