= Granuloma gluteale infantum =

- Specialty: Dermatology

Granuloma gluteale infantum is a cutaneous condition that appears in the anogenital region of infants as a complication of diaper dermatitis. According to some, no granulomas are found.

== Signs and symptoms ==
In cases of primary irritant contact dermatitis, the lesions manifest clinically as numerous asymptomatic erythematous papules and nodules in the diaper area.

== Causes ==
Granuloma gluteale infantum is an uncommon dermatosis of infancy with an unknown etiology. Contributing factors include prolonged use of fluorinated steroids, and benzocaine, diaper occlusion in incontinent adults and infants, candidiasis, and irritant contact dermatitis.

== Diagnosis ==
The histological picture shows an underlying hyperplastic epidermis and parakeratosis, accompanied by a non-specific perivascular dermal infiltrate made up of neutrophils, histiocytes, lymphocytes, plasma cells, and eosinophils.

== Treatment ==
In order to treat granuloma gluteale infantum, the diaper area needs to be kept dry and clean, and the irritant should be eliminated or lessened. It is recommended to use a barrier cream, such as zinc oxide.

== See also ==
- Superficial granulomatous pyoderma
- List of cutaneous conditions
