= Xerotic eczema =

- Other names: Eczema craquelé, Pruritus hiemalis, Asteatotic eczema, Winter itch, Desiccation dermatitis, and Winter eczema)
- Specialty: Dermatology

Xerotic eczema is a form of eczema that is characterized by changes that occur when skin becomes abnormally dry, red, itchy, and cracked. It tends to occur more often during the winter and in dry conditions.

Xerotic eczema is common in elderly people, though it is not uncommon for people in their 20s. It can appear in red, bumpy, pimple-like irritations.

== Treatment ==
The first method that should be taken when treating xerotic eczema is attempting to re-hydrate the dry skin using a humidifier and bathing/showering less frequently. Mild and moisturizing soaps should be used to prevent further irritation. Scratching the affected area should be avoided. Applying moisturizing lotion or anti-itch ointment frequently should help in reducing dryness.

If the re-hydration process does not alleviate the symptoms, moisturizers such as Lac-Hydrin 5% or 12% moisturizer containing urea can be used; furthermore, if the skin becomes inflamed or cracked, mid- to high-potency corticosteroids can be used.

A study published in 2005 found positive results from soaking the affected area in water for twenty minutes and then applying mid- to high-strength corticosteroid ointment.

== See also ==
- Skin lesion
