= Diflorasone diacetate =

Chemical compound and topical steroid

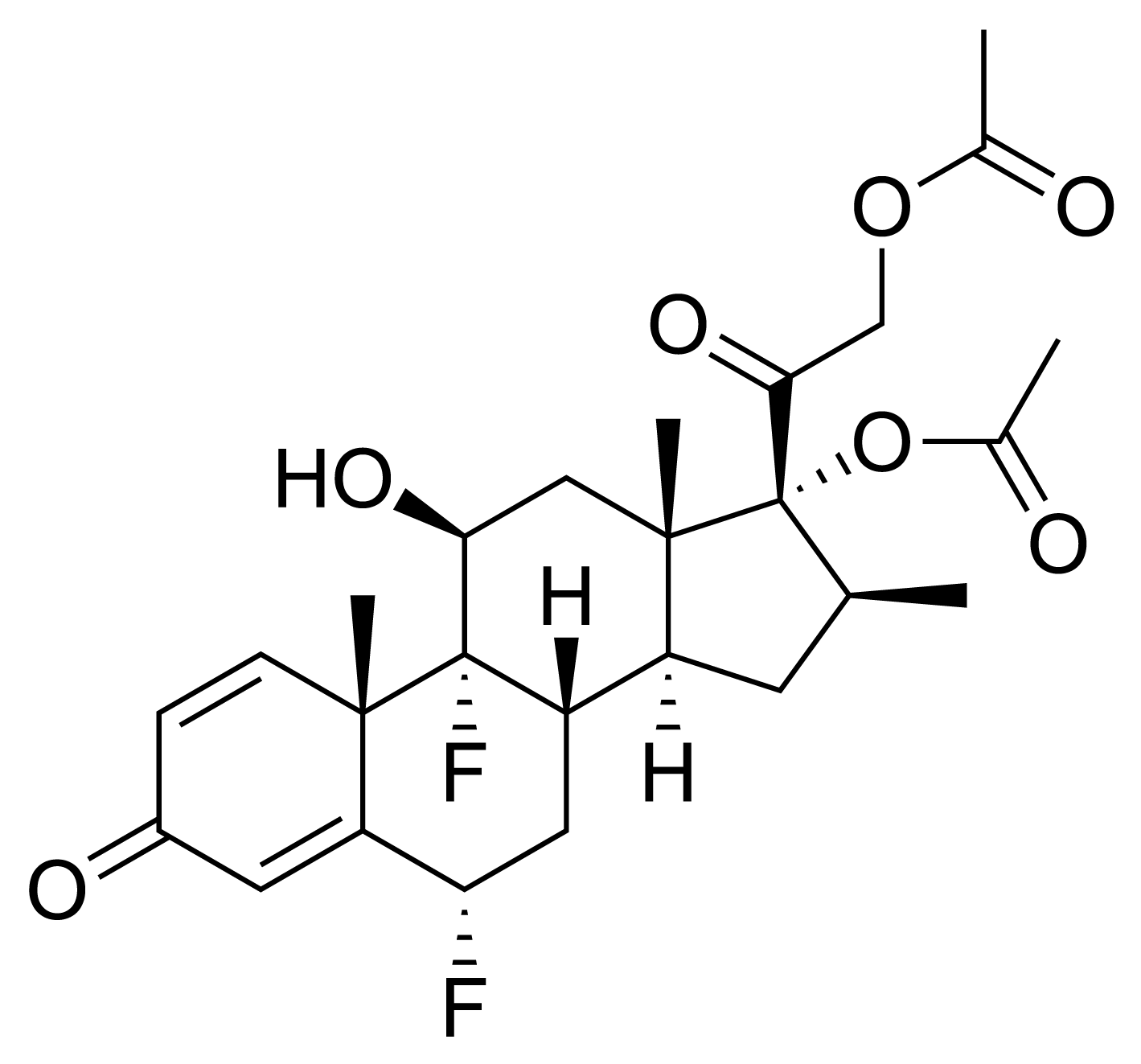

Clinical data
- Trade names: Psorcon
- AHFS/Drugs.com: Monograph
- MedlinePlus: a602019
- License data: US DailyMed: Diflorasone
- Routes of administration: Topical
- ATC code: D07AC10 (WHO)

Legal status
- Legal status: US: ℞-only

Identifiers
- IUPAC name: [17-(2-Acetyloxyacetyl)- 6,9-difluoro-11-hydroxy-10,13,16-trimethyl-3-oxo-6,7,8,11,12,14,15,16- octahydrocyclopenta[a]phenanthren-17-yl] acetate
- CAS Number: 2557-49-5
- PubChem CID: 71414
- IUPHAR/BPS: 7068
- DrugBank: DB00223
- ChemSpider: 64504
- UNII: T2DHJ9645W
- KEGG: D01327
- ChEBI: CHEBI:31483
- ChEMBL: ChEMBL1201380
- CompTox Dashboard (EPA): DTXSID8045646
- ECHA InfoCard: 100.046.872

Chemical and physical data
- Formula: C_{26}H_{32}F_{2}O_{7}
- Molar mass: 494.532 g·mol^{−1}
- InChI: InChI=1S/C26H32F2O7/c1-13-8-17-18-10-20(27)19-9-16(31)6-7-23(19,4)25(18,28)21(32)11-24(17,5)26(13,35-15(3)30)22(33)12-34-14(2)29/h6-7,9,13,17-18,20-21,32H,8,10-12H2,1-5H3/t13-,17-,18-,20-,21-,23-,24-,25-,26-/m0/s1; Key:BOBLHFUVNSFZPJ-JOYXJVLSSA-N

Diflorasone diacetate is a topical steroid that comes in the form of a cream. It is manufactured by E. Fougera & Co. and is used as an anti-inflammatory and anti-itching agent, like other topical corticosteroids. It is prescribed for psoriasis and atopic dermatitis, among other conditions. With respect to potency, it is regarded as a Class I corticosteroid [of classes I – VII] in the United States.

No long-term animal studies have been done to determine whether diflorasone diacetate could have carcinogenic properties.

Little data is available regarding whether diflorasone diacetate would be present in great enough quantities to cause harm to an infant.
