= Hydrocortisone butyrate =

Class of chemical compounds

Steroid skeleton. Carbons 18 and above can be absent. Note locations of #17 and #21.

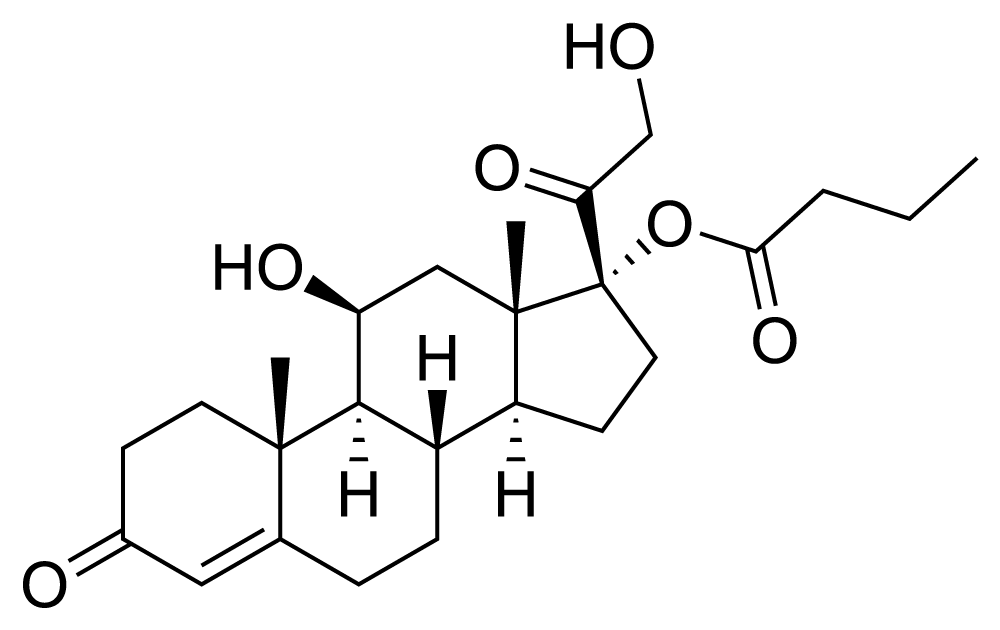
hydrocortisone-17-butyrate

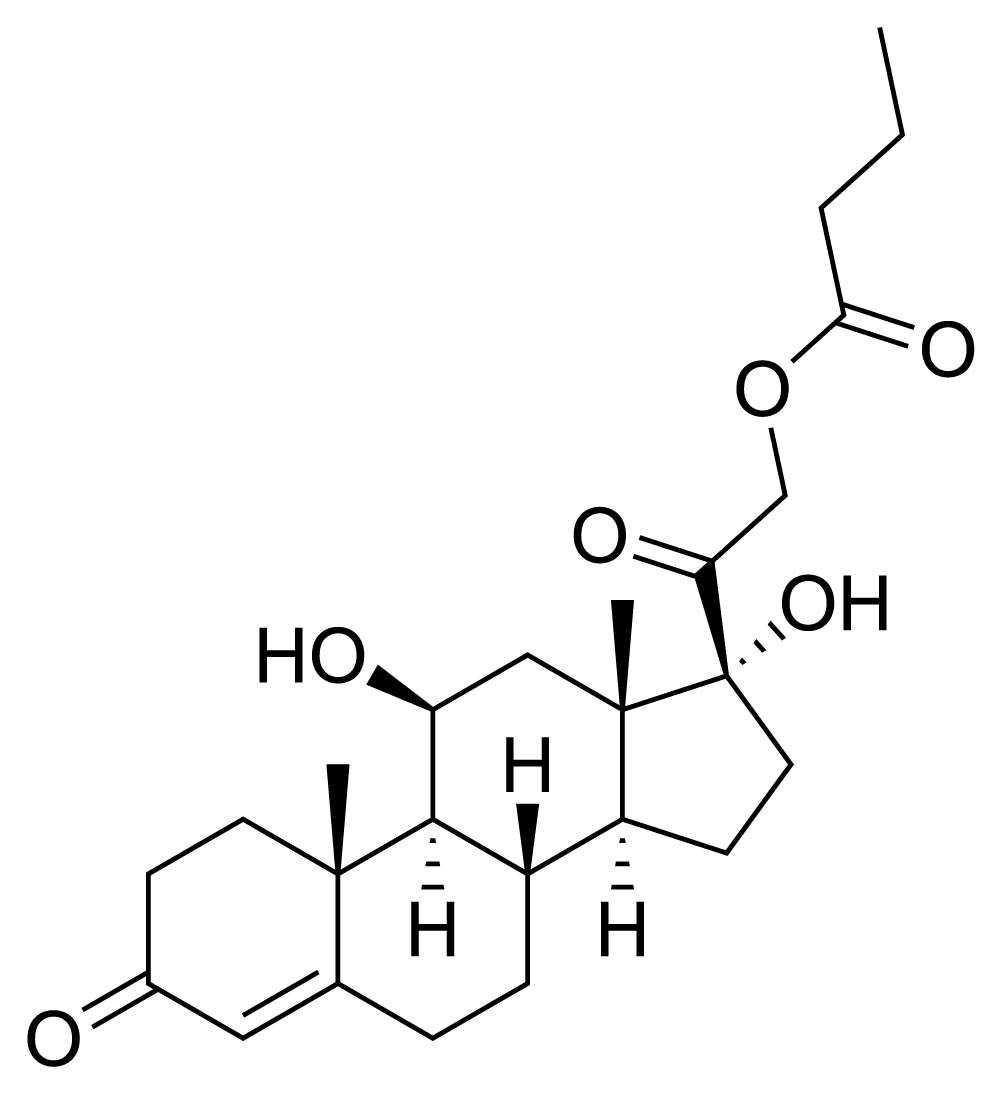
hydrocortisone-21-butyrate

Hydrocortisone butyrate is a corticosteroid that comes in one of the following forms:

- Hydrocortisone-17-butyrate — CID 26133 from PubChem
- Hydrocortisone-21-butyrate — CID 23144 from PubChem

It is a group IV corticosteroid under US classification.

== See also ==
- Cortisol
