= Hydrocortisone 17-butyrate =

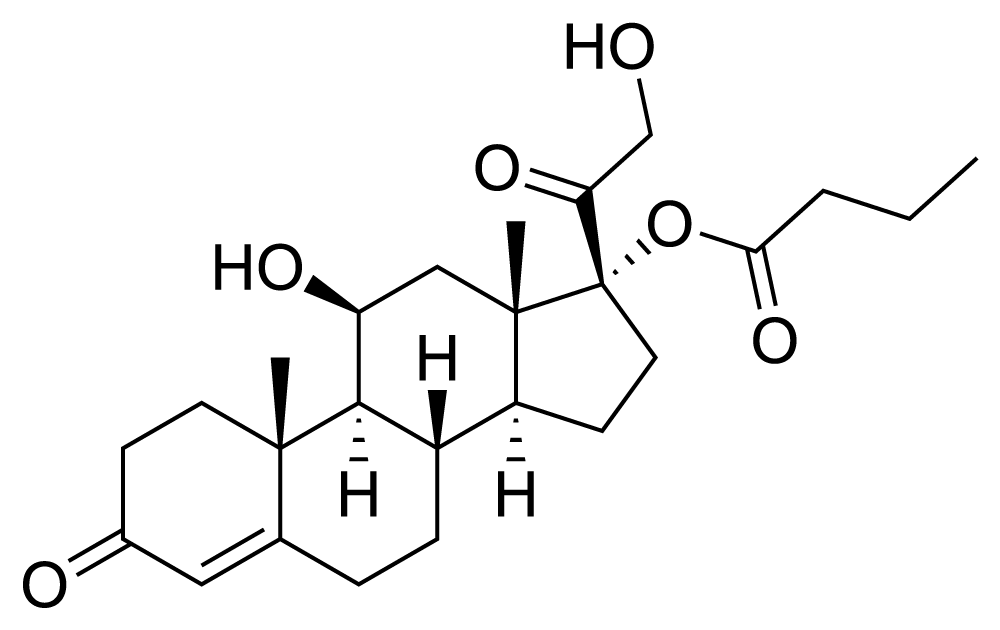

Names
- IUPAC name 11β,21-Dihydroxy-3,20-dioxopregn-4-en-17α-yl butanoate
- Systematic IUPAC name (1R,3aS,3bS,9aR,9bS,10S,11aS)-10-Hydroxy-1-(hydroxyacetyl)-9a,11a-dimethyl-7-oxo-2,3,3a,3b,4,5,7,8,9,9a,9b,10,11,11a-tetradecahydro-1H-cyclopenta[a]phenanthren-1-yl butanoate

Identifiers
CAS Number	13609-67-1
3D model (JSmol)	Interactive image
ChEBI	CHEBI:31674
ChEMBL	ChEMBL1683
ChemSpider	24344
DrugBank	DB14540
ECHA InfoCard	100.033.707
PubChem CID	26133
UNII	05RMF7YPWN
CompTox Dashboard (EPA)	DTXSID4045896
- InChI: InChI=1S/C25H36O6/c1-4-5-21(30)31-25(20(29)14-26)11-9-18-17-7-6-15-12-16(27)8-10-23(15,2)22(17)19(28)13-24(18,25)3/h12,17-19,22,26,28H,4-11,13-14H2,1-3H3/t17-,18-,19-,22+,23-,24-,25-/m0/s1 Key: BMCQMVFGOVHVNG-TUFAYURCSA-N; InChI=1/C25H36O6/c1-4-5-21(30)31-25(20(29)14-26)11-9-18-17-7-6-15-12-16(27)8-10-23(15,2)22(17)19(28)13-24(18,25)3/h12,17-19,22,26,28H,4-11,13-14H2,1-3H3/t17-,18-,19-,22+,23-,24-,25-/m0/s1 Key: BMCQMVFGOVHVNG-TUFAYURCBW
- SMILES: O=C4\C=C2/[C@]([C@H]1[C@@H](O)C[C@@]3([C@@](OC(=O)CCC)(C(=O)CO)CC[C@H]3[C@@H]1CC2)C)(C)CC4

Properties
Chemical formula	C_{25}H_{36}O_{6}
Molar mass	432.55 g/mol
- Except where otherwise noted, data are given for materials in their standard state (at 25 °C [77 °F], 100 kPa). verify (what is ?) Infobox references

Hydrocortisone 17-butyrate is a form of hydrocortisone butyrate.

== See also ==
- Glucocorticoid
- Corticosteroid
