= Hydrocortisone valerate =

Chemical compound

Clinical data
- Other names: Cortisol 17-valerate; Westcort; Hydrocortisone 17-valerate
- Drug class: Corticosteroid; Glucocorticoid

Identifiers
- IUPAC name: [(8S,9S,10R,11S,13S,14S,17R)-11-Hydroxy-17-(2-hydroxyacetyl)-10,13-dimethyl-3-oxo-2,6,7,8,9,11,12,14,15,16-decahydro-1H-cyclopenta[a]phenanthren-17-yl] pentanoate
- CAS Number: 57524-89-7
- PubChem CID: 5282494
- DrugBank: DB14544
- ChemSpider: 4445635
- UNII: 68717P8FUZ
- ChEBI: CHEBI:50865
- ChEMBL: ChEMBL1200562
- CompTox Dashboard (EPA): DTXSID9045633
- ECHA InfoCard: 100.055.242

Chemical and physical data
- Formula: C_{26}H_{38}O_{6}
- Molar mass: 446.584 g·mol^{−1}
- 3D model (JSmol): Interactive image
- SMILES: CCCCC(=O)O[C@@]1(CC[C@@H]2[C@@]1(C[C@@H]([C@H]3[C@H]2CCC4=CC(=O)CC[C@]34C)O)C)C(=O)CO
- InChI: InChI=1S/C26H38O6/c1-4-5-6-22(31)32-26(21(30)15-27)12-10-19-18-8-7-16-13-17(28)9-11-24(16,2)23(18)20(29)14-25(19,26)3/h13,18-20,23,27,29H,4-12,14-15H2,1-3H3/t18-,19-,20-,23+,24-,25-,26-/m0/s1; Key:FZCHYNWYXKICIO-FZNHGJLXSA-N

Hydrocortisone valerate is a synthetic glucocorticoid corticosteroid and a corticosteroid ester. It can be used as a medicine to treat itching, swelling, and other skin conditions.
