= Topical steroid withdrawal =

- Other names: Topical steroid rebound phenomena (TSRP), steroid dermatitis, red burning skin syndrome, red skin syndrome, iatrogenic exfoliative dermatitis (idiopathic erythroderma)
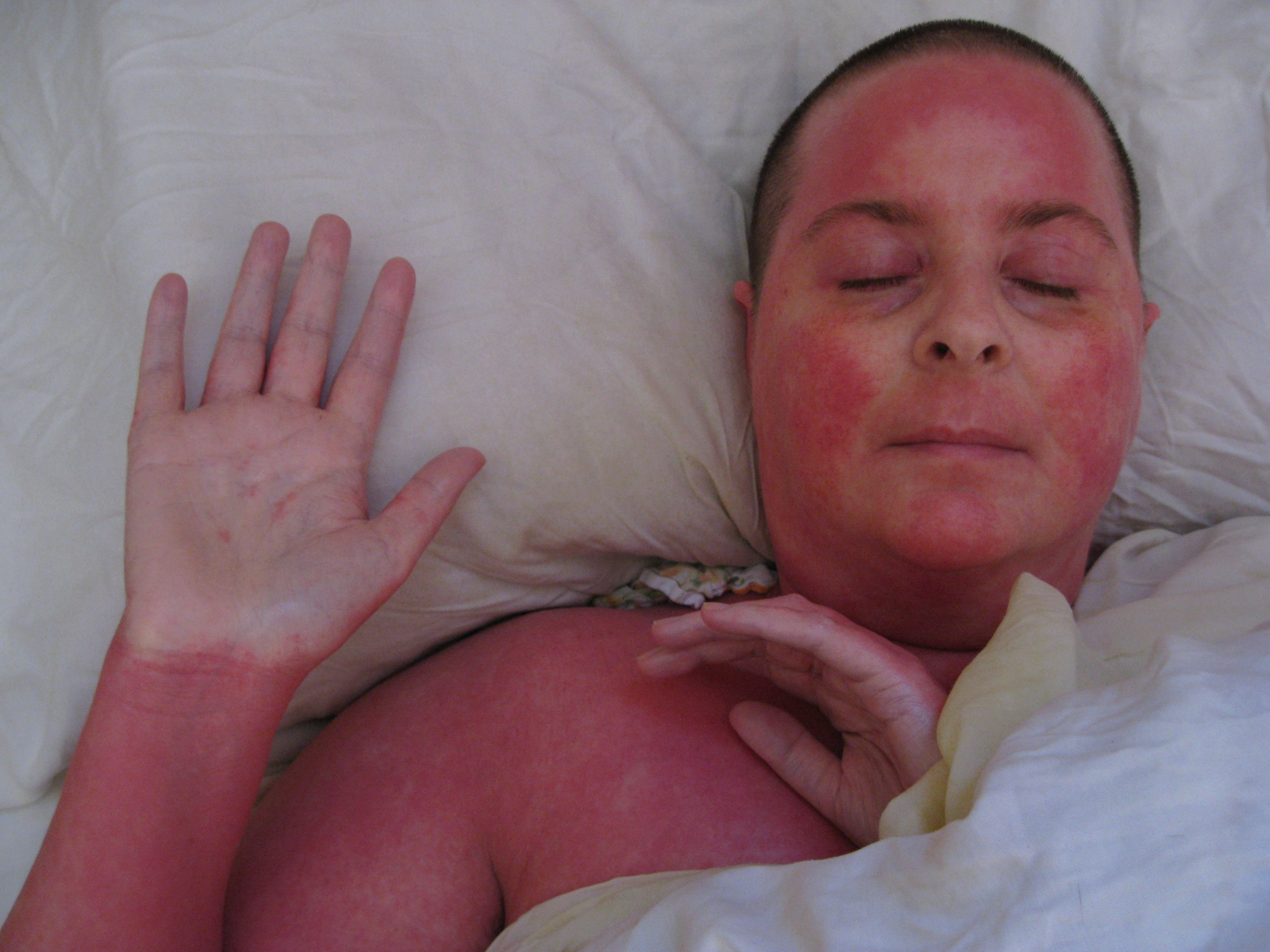
- Red burning skin syndrome from topical steroids. Face pattern with nose sign and spared palms (soles also spared)
- Specialty: Dermatology
- Symptoms: Red skin, burning sensation, desquamation, itchiness
- Causes: Stopping topical steroids after frequent long-term use
- Prevention: Using steroid creams for less than two weeks
- Frequency: Not known

Topical steroid rebound phenomena (TSRP), commonly known as topical steroid withdrawal (TSW), red burning skin syndrome or steroid dermatitis, has been reported in people who apply topical steroids for 2 weeks or longer and then discontinue use. Symptoms affect the skin and include redness, a burning sensation, and itchiness, which may then be followed by peeling.

This condition generally requires the daily application of a topical steroid for more than 2 weeks but sometimes can occur with even less steroid use. It appears to be a specific adverse effect of topical corticosteroid use. People with atopic dermatitis are most at risk.

Treatment involves discontinuing the use of topical steroids, either gradually or suddenly. Counselling and cold compresses may also help. Thousands of people congregate in online communities to support one another throughout the healing process, and cases have been reported in both adults and children. It was first described in 1979.

== Signs and symptoms ==
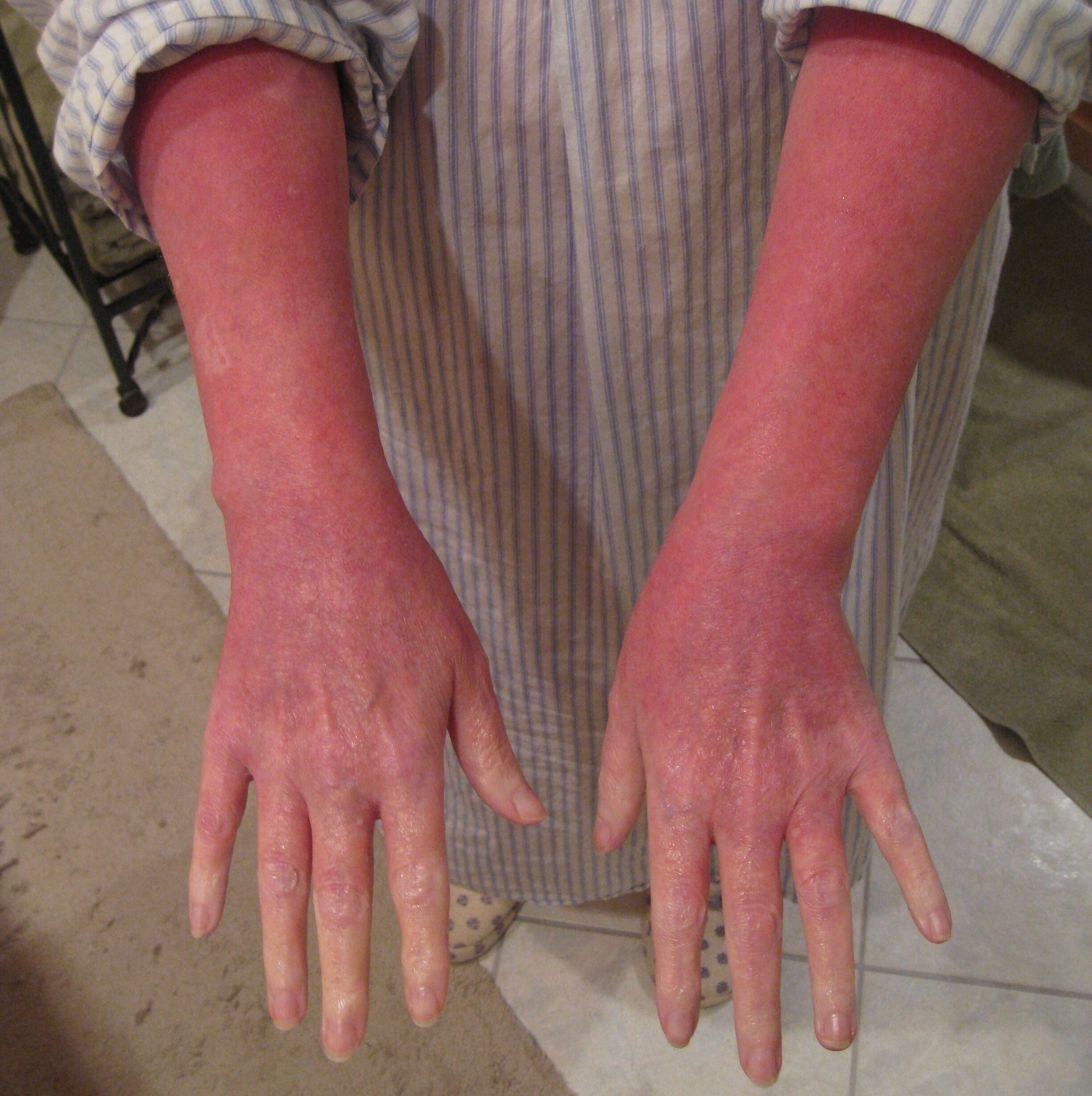
Red burning skin syndrome from topical steroids. Typical pattern on lower arms and hands

Before discontinuation, steroid dermatitis is characterised by spreading dermatitis and worsening skin inflammation, which requires a stronger topical steroid to get the same result as the first prescription. This cycle is known as steroid addiction syndrome. When topical steroid medication is stopped, the skin experiences redness, burning, itchiness, scabs, hot skin, swelling, stinging, hives, or oozing. This is known as topical steroid withdrawal. After the withdrawal period is over, the atopic dermatitis can cease or is less severe than it was before. Topical steroid withdrawal has also been reported in the male scrotum area. TSW has multisystem manifestations extending beyond the skin, including neuropathic pain, sensory disturbances, sleep disruption, temperature dysregulation, anxiety, and depression.

=== Duration ===
The duration of acute topical corticosteroid withdrawal is variable; the skin can take months to years to return to its original condition.

== Cause ==
Topical steroid withdrawal is reported following discontinuation of topical corticosteroids, particularly after prolonged or frequent use of moderate- to high-potency preparations. The minimum exposure duration required to provoke withdrawal has not been established.

== Mechanism of action ==
Historically, it was believed that cortisol was only produced by the adrenal glands, but research has shown that keratinocytes in human skin also produce cortisol. Prolonged topical steroid (TS) application changes the glucocorticoid receptor (GR) expression pattern on the surface of lymphocytes; a patient experiencing resistance to a TS has a low ratio of GR-α to GR-β. In addition, the erythema characteristic of 'red skin syndrome' is due to a release of stored endothelial nitric oxide (NO) and subsequent vasodilation of dermal vessels.

A 2025 pilot study by Shobnam et al. (n=16) reported that topical steroid withdrawal is associated with overexpression of mitochondrial complex I, leading to elevated NAD+ and the conversion of tryptophan into kynurenine metabolites; the authors also reported symptom improvement in an open-label series treated with mitochondrial complex I inhibitors.

The findings have been the subject of academic correspondence in the United Kingdom. Brown and Burleigh argued in the Journal of Investigative Dermatology that the small sample size and underpowered analyses meant the proposed molecular and cellular mechanisms remained unexplained and warranted further research. In reply, Shobnam et al. agreed that larger studies are needed and that the diagnostic criteria lacked specificity, while maintaining that the work nonetheless provided initial mechanistic insights. A separate letter by Tan, Dawe and Affleck in Clinical and Experimental Dermatology raised concerns that recruitment through topical steroid withdrawal advocacy organisations introduced collider bias.

In a 2026 narrative review in Frontiers in Medicine, Myles and Ratley defended the study design while acknowledging that biomarkers obtainable in standard clinical laboratories have not yet been identified and that the proposed mechanisms require validation in larger cohorts.

== Diagnosis ==
Diagnosis is based on a rash occurring within weeks of stopping long-term topical steroids. Specific signs include "headlight sign" (redness of the lower part of the face but not the nose or the area around the mouth), "red sleeve" (a rebound eruption stopping abruptly at the lower arms and hands), and "elephant wrinkles" (reduced skin elasticity).

Differentiating this condition from the skin condition that the steroids were originally used to treat can be difficult. Red, burning skin may be misdiagnosed.

== Prevention ==
The minimum exposure duration required to provoke topical steroid withdrawal has not been established. Limiting prolonged or frequent use of topical corticosteroids, particularly higher-potency preparations, may reduce the risk, but no universally safe exposure threshold has been identified.

== Treatment ==
Treatment involves ceasing all use of topical steroids. Antihistamines may help for itchiness. Immunosuppressants and light therapy may also help some people. Psychological support is often recommended. At this time, treatment options that have been documented in literature include tacrolimus, pimecrolimus, dupilumab (Dupixent), and Dr. Sato's No Moisture Therapy (NMT). Some physicians have also seen positive outcomes with oral doxycycline topical clindamycin.

== Epidemiology ==
The prevalence of topical steroid withdrawal is unknown. By using an indirect calculation of poorly controlled dermatitis in a Japanese survey, Fukaya et al. (2014) proposed that approximately 12% of adults with atopic dermatitis treated with topical corticosteroids might experience topical steroid addiction.

== History ==
A systematic review (meta-analysis) in accordance with evidence-based medicine frameworks and current research standards for clinical decision-making was performed in 2016 and was republished with updates in 2020.
