= Coicenal =

Class of chemical compounds

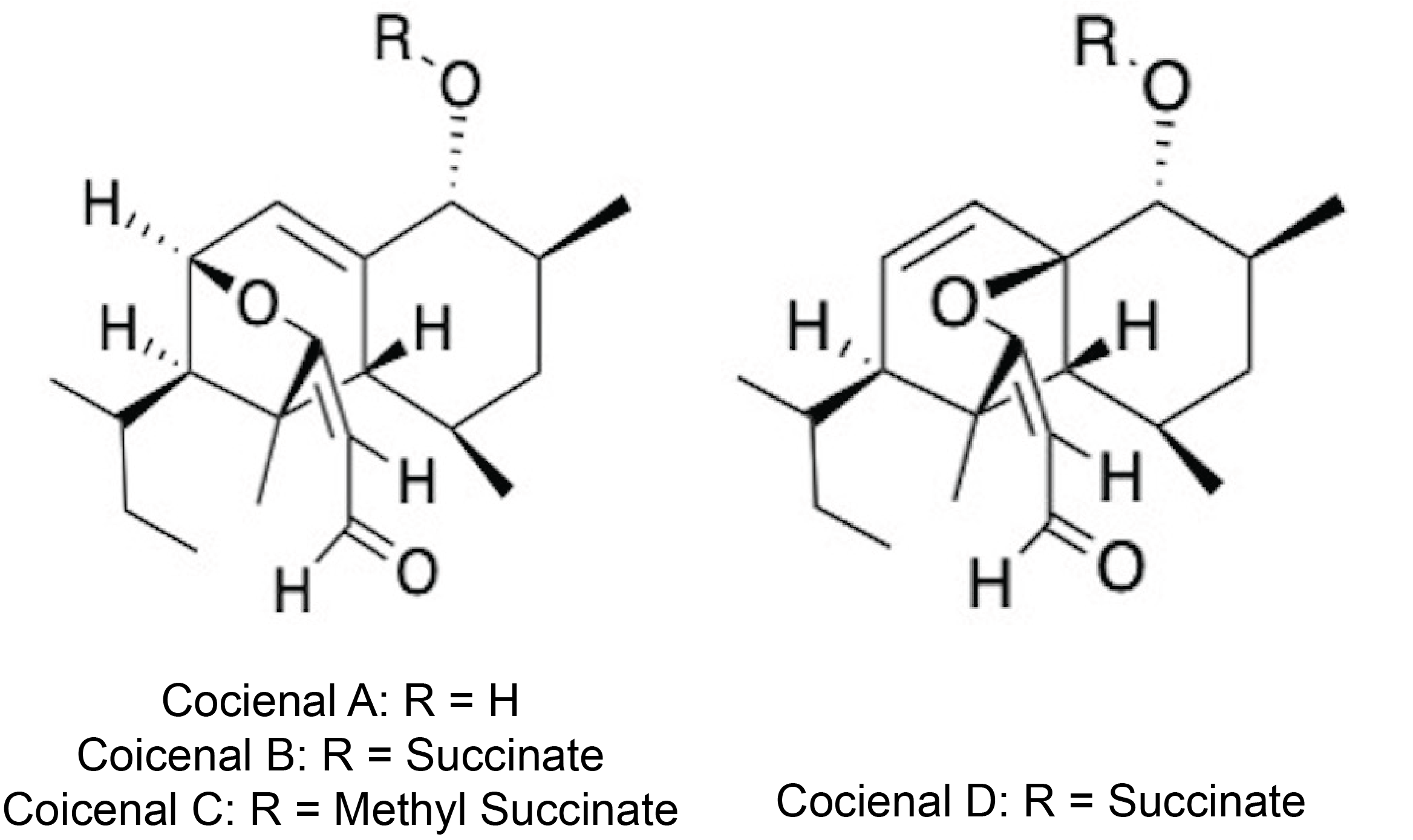
- Coicenal Family

Names
- Preferred IUPAC name (2Z)-2-[(1R,2R,3S,5R,6R,7S,8S)-8-butan-2-yl-2-hydroxy-3,5,7-trimethyl-11-oxatricyclo[5.3.2.01,6]dodec-9-en-12-ylidene]acetaldehyde

Identifiers
3D model (JSmol)	Interactive image; A: Interactive image; B: Interactive image; C: Interactive image; D: Interactive image
PubChem CID	102527066; A: 102527063; B: 102527064; C: 102527065; D: 102527066
- InChI: InChI=1S/C20H30O3/c1-6-12(2)15-7-9-20-17(13(3)11-14(4)18(20)22)19(15,5)16(23-20)8-10-21/h7-10,12-15,17-18,22H,6,11H2,1-5H3/b16-8-/t12?,13-,14+,15-,17-,18-,19-,20-/m1/s1 Key: IHGAEHWJSSLSRR-CFBDQFINSA-N; A: InChI=1S/C20H30O3/c1-6-11(2)18-15-10-14-17(12(3)9-13(4)19(14)22)20(18,5)16(23-15)7-8-21/h7-8,10-13,15,17-19,22H,6,9H2,1-5H3/b16-7-/t11?,12-,13+,15+,17+,18+,19-,20+/m1/s1 Key: VLVIMVZGQOTSGT-PVOILIQDSA-N; B: InChI=1S/C24H34O6/c1-6-13(2)22-17-12-16-21(24(22,5)18(29-17)9-10-25)14(3)11-15(4)23(16)30-20(28)8-7-19(26)27/h9-10,12-15,17,21-23H,6-8,11H2,1-5H3,(H,26,27)/b18-9-/t13?,14-,15+,17+,21+,22+,23-,24+/m1/s1 Key: WZRUTTFXDCERSK-PXMPJTSQSA-N; C: InChI=1S/C25H36O6/c1-7-14(2)23-18-13-17-22(25(23,5)19(30-18)10-11-26)15(3)12-16(4)24(17)31-21(28)9-8-20(27)29-6/h10-11,13-16,18,22-24H,7-9,12H2,1-6H3/b19-10-/t14?,15-,16+,18+,22+,23+,24-,25+/m1/s1 Key: CETRZRNQBVTCKB-UXPXVMCKSA-N; D: InChI=1S/C20H30O3/c1-6-12(2)15-7-9-20-17(13(3)11-14(4)18(20)22)19(15,5)16(23-20)8-10-21/h7-10,12-15,17-18,22H,6,11H2,1-5H3/b16-8-/t12?,13-,14+,15-,17-,18-,19-,20-/m1/s1 Key: IHGAEHWJSSLSRR-CFBDQFINSA-N
- SMILES: CCC(C)C1C=CC23C(C1(C(=CC=O)O2)C)C(CC(C3O)C)C; A: CCC(C)[C@H]1[C@@H]2C=C3[C@@H]([C@@]1(/C(=C/C=O)/O2)C)[C@@H](C[C@@H]([C@H]3O)C)C; B: CCC(C)[C@H]1[C@@H]2C=C3[C@@H]([C@@]1(/C(=C/C=O)/O2)C)[C@@H](C[C@@H]([C@H]3OC(=O)CCC(=O)O)C)C; C: CCC(C)[C@H]1[C@@H]2C=C3[C@@H]([C@@]1(/C(=C/C=O)/O2)C)[C@@H](C[C@@H]([C@H]3OC(=O)CCC(=O)OC)C)C; D: CCC(C)[C@H]1C=C[C@]23[C@@H]([C@]1(/C(=C/C=O)/O2)C)[C@@H](C[C@@H]([C@H]3O)C)C

Properties
Chemical formula	A: C_{20}H_{30}O_{3,}B: C_{24}H_{34}O_{6,}C: C_{25}H_{36}O_{6,}D: C_{20}H_{30}O_{3}
Molar mass	318.4 g/mol
- Except where otherwise noted, data are given for materials in their standard state (at 25 °C [77 °F], 100 kPa). Infobox references

Coicenals are a class of naturally occurring diterpenes extracted from the pathogenic fungus Bipolaris coicis. The four derivatives are named coicenal A-D. These molecules have an underlying bridged-ring structure with an acetaldehyde group. Biosynthetic pathways have been determined for these molecules, but total syntheses have not yet been published.

== Derivatives ==
Coicenals A-C share the common carbon skeleton of 10-(sec-butyl)-6-hydroxy-1,7,9-trimethyl-1,6,7,8,9,9a-hexahydro-1,4-methanobenzo[d]oxepin-2(4H)-ylidene)acetaldehyde. The molecular formulas of each derivative were determined via high-resolution electrospray ionization mass spectrometry. The R group of Coicenal A is a hydrogen. Coicenal B contains a succinate group for its R group. The R group of Coicenal C is a methyl succinate group. Coicenal D contains a different carbon skeleton than A-C and a succinate group for its R group.

== Discovery ==
Originally, there was no common name for the skeleton of coicenal A-C. In 2013, Quan-xin Wang and his research team in Beijing discovered the structure of coicenal D by reacting the carbon skeletons of coicenal A and coicenal B with acetyl chloride at room temperature. This novel finding and resultant publication prompted the official classification of these 4 diterpenes as coicenal A-D.

Wang's team began their study to search for new secondary metabolites from a solid culture of Bipolaris coicis. They used high-performance liquid chromatography with diode array detection and searched for characteristic UV maximal absorption at 280 nm. This investigation was inspired by previous discoveries of secondary metabolites in the Bipolaris family by other researchers.

== Biological significance and potential pharmacological utility ==
As a natural product, coicenals have been tested for their pharmacological utility. One study showed that coicenals exhibit moderate inhibitory activity against nitric oxide released from macrophages. Since nitric oxide is crucial to inflammatory processes, this biological ability could translate to medicinal use for treating inflammatory diseases. Coicenal C has also demonstrated its ability to inhibit the growth of Bacillus subtilis and Staphylococcus aureus. Coicenals A, B, and D do not bear this ability, however.

== Preparation ==
A total synthesis of the coicenal family has not been conducted, but a method to prepare coicenal diterpenes for anti-inflammatory medicine was patented in 2013. There are minor differences between the synthetic analogs outlined in the patent and naturally occurring coicenals. The patent's synthesis procedure uses Bipolaris coicis as a starting material. Synthesis routes for coicenal A-C are presented, and each share the following similarities. First, a bacterial sample of Bipolaris coicis is fermented for 40 days at 28 °C. The fully fermented sample is then ultrasonicated and the resultant solution is collected. After rotary evaporation, this crude extract is purified via silica gel column chromatography. The yielded dry matter is then purified via gel permeation chromatography, followed by high-performance liquid chromatography. The final structure of the synthesized coisenals are then determined by proton nuclear magnetic resonance.

== Recent research proposing reclassification ==
A March 2023 study published in Natural Products Research by Thanabalasingam et al. proposes that the double bond geometry in Coicenal A is of the (Z)- configuration rather than the originally proposed (E)- configuration. This claim was based on cross peak similarities between the nuclear Overhauser effect spectra of coicenal A and H-2 to H3-15 of oryazanigral, a heptaketide isolated from the endophytic fungus, Nigrospora oryzae. This study also proposes that Coicenals should not be classified as diterpenes since they contain a 6-oxabicyclo[3,2,1]oct-3-ene scaffold, characteristic of tricyclic heptaketides. Further research is needed to conclusively determine the proper classification of coicenals.
