= Alclometasone dipropionate =

Chemical compound

Clinical data
- Trade names: Delonal, Vaderm
- Other names: Alclometasone 17α,21-dipropionate; Sch-22219
- Drug class: Corticosteroid; Glucocorticoid

Identifiers
- IUPAC name: [2-[(7R,8S,9S,10R,11S,13S,14S,16R,17R)-7-Chloro-11-hydroxy-10,13,16-trimethyl-3-oxo-17-propanoyloxy-7,8,9,11,12,14,15,16-octahydro-6H-cyclopenta[a]phenanthren-17-yl]-2-oxoethyl] propanoate
- CAS Number: 66734-13-2
- PubChem CID: 636374
- ChemSpider: 552169
- UNII: S56PQL4N1V
- KEGG: D01820
- ChEBI: CHEBI:31184
- ChEMBL: ChEMBL1200989
- CompTox Dashboard (EPA): DTXSID6045535
- ECHA InfoCard: 100.060.403

Chemical and physical data
- Formula: C_{28}H_{37}ClO_{7}
- Molar mass: 521.05 g·mol^{−1}
- 3D model (JSmol): Interactive image
- SMILES: CCC(=O)OCC(=O)[C@]1([C@@H](C[C@@H]2[C@@]1(C[C@@H]([C@H]3[C@H]2[C@@H](CC4=CC(=O)C=C[C@]34C)Cl)O)C)C)OC(=O)CC
- InChI: InChI=1S/C28H37ClO7/c1-6-22(33)35-14-21(32)28(36-23(34)7-2)15(3)10-18-24-19(29)12-16-11-17(30)8-9-26(16,4)25(24)20(31)13-27(18,28)5/h8-9,11,15,18-20,24-25,31H,6-7,10,12-14H2,1-5H3/t15-,18+,19-,20+,24-,25+,26+,27+,28+/m1/s1; Key:DJHCCTTVDRAMEH-DUUJBDRPSA-N

Alclometasone dipropionate (USAN, BANM), also known as alclometasone 17α,21-dipropionate and sold under the brand names Delonal and Vaderm among others, is a synthetic glucocorticoid corticosteroid and a corticosteroid ester.

== See also ==
- List of corticosteroid esters
