= Fluocinonide =

Chemical compound

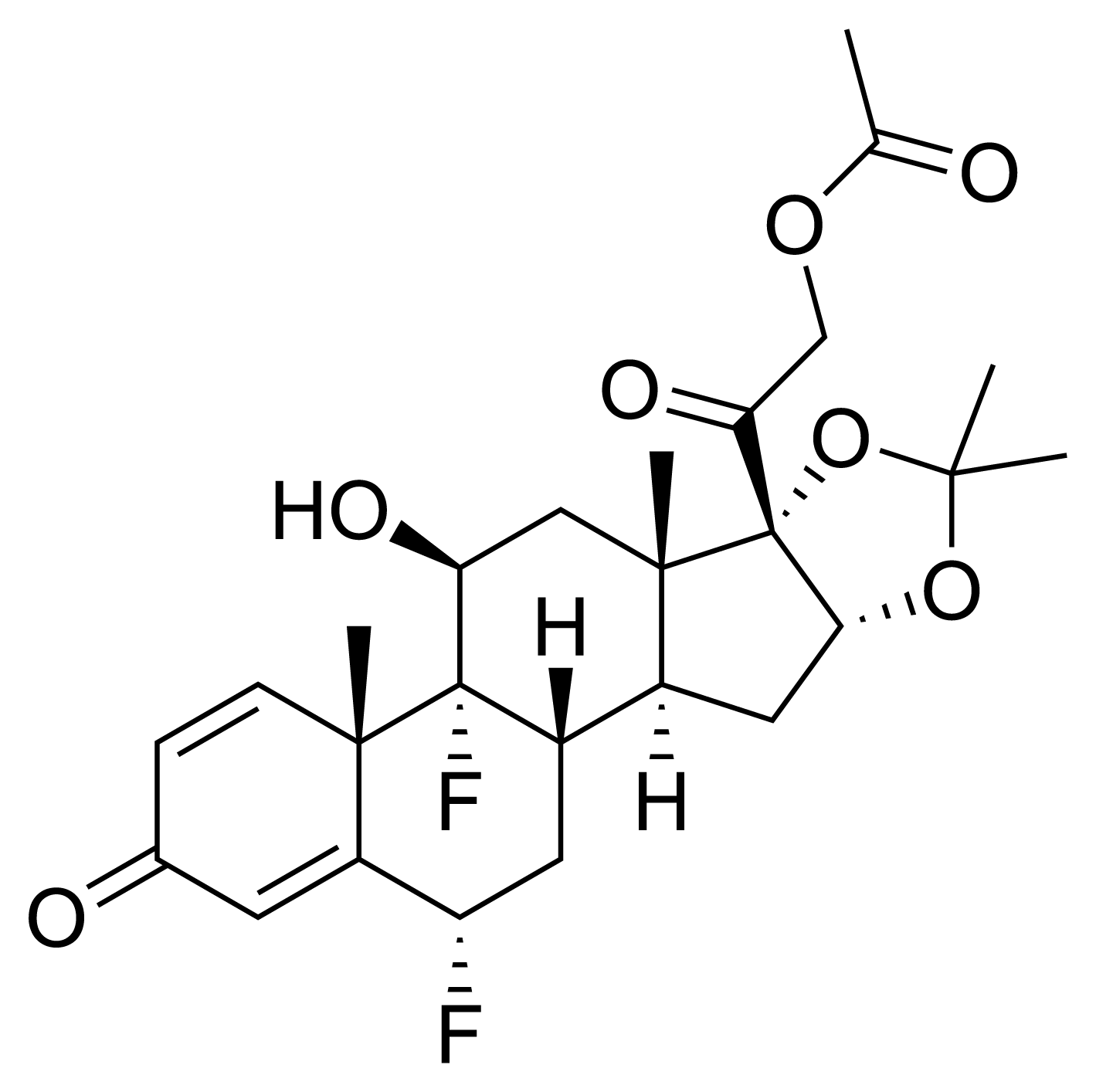

Clinical data
- Trade names: Fluonex, Lidex, others
- AHFS/Drugs.com: Micromedex Detailed Consumer Information
- MedlinePlus: a601054
- Routes of administration: Topical
- ATC code: C05AA11 (WHO) D07AC08 (WHO), QC05AA11 (WHO), QD07AC08 (WHO)

Legal status
- Legal status: AU: S4 (Prescription only); UK: POM (Prescription only); US: ℞-only

Pharmacokinetic data
- Metabolism: Liver

Identifiers
- IUPAC name: 6α,9-difluoro-11β,16α,17,21-tetrahydroxypregna-1,4-diene-3,20-dione, cyclic 16,17-acetal with acetone,21-acetate
- CAS Number: 356-12-7
- PubChem CID: 9642
- IUPHAR/BPS: 7078
- DrugBank: DB01047
- ChemSpider: 9265
- UNII: 2W4A77YPAN
- KEGG: D00325
- ChEMBL: ChEMBL1501
- CompTox Dashboard (EPA): DTXSID8045307
- ECHA InfoCard: 100.005.998

Chemical and physical data
- Formula: C_{26}H_{32}F_{2}O_{7}
- Molar mass: 494.532 g·mol^{−1}
- 3D model (JSmol): Interactive image
- SMILES: O=C(OCC(=O)[C@]45OC(O[C@@H]5C[C@@H]2[C@@]4(C[C@H](O)[C@]3(F)[C@]/1(/C=C\C(=O)\C=C\1[C@@H](F)C[C@@H]23)C)C)(C)C)C
- InChI: InChI=1S/C26H32F2O7/c1-13(29)33-12-20(32)26-21(34-22(2,3)35-26)10-15-16-9-18(27)17-8-14(30)6-7-23(17,4)25(16,28)19(31)11-24(15,26)5/h6-8,15-16,18-19,21,31H,9-12H2,1-5H3/t15-,16-,18-,19-,21+,23-,24-,25-,26+/m0/s1; Key:WJOHZNCJWYWUJD-IUGZLZTKSA-N

Fluocinonide is a potent glucocorticoid used topically as an anti-inflammatory agent for the treatment of skin disorders such as eczema and seborrhoeic dermatitis. It relieves itching, redness, dryness, crusting, scaling, inflammation, and discomfort.

A common potential adverse effect is skin atrophy (thinning of the skin).

In 2022, it was the 266th most commonly prescribed medication in the United States, with more than 1 million prescriptions.

== Veterinary uses ==
Fluocinonide is used in veterinary medicine. It is a treatment for allergies in dogs. Natural systemic cortisol concentrations can be suppressed for weeks after one week of topical exposure.
