= Hydrocortisone acetate =

Chemical compound

Clinical data
- Other names: Cortisol 21-acetate
- Drug class: Corticosteroid; Glucocorticoid

Identifiers
- IUPAC name: [2-[(8S,9S,10R,11S,13S,14S,17R)-11,17-Dihydroxy-10,13-dimethyl-3-oxo-2,6,7,8,9,11,12,14,15,16-decahydro-1H-cyclopenta[a]phenanthren-17-yl]-2-oxoethyl] acetate
- CAS Number: 50-03-3
- PubChem CID: 5744
- DrugBank: DB14539
- ChemSpider: 5542
- UNII: 3X7931PO74
- KEGG: D00165
- ChEBI: CHEBI:17609
- ChEMBL: ChEMBL1091
- CompTox Dashboard (EPA): DTXSID20962156 DTXSID0048686, DTXSID20962156
- ECHA InfoCard: 100.000.005

Chemical and physical data
- Formula: C_{23}H_{32}O_{6}
- Molar mass: 404.503 g·mol^{−1}
- 3D model (JSmol): Interactive image
- SMILES: CC(=O)OCC(=O)[C@]1(CC[C@@H]2[C@@]1(C[C@@H]([C@H]3[C@H]2CCC4=CC(=O)CC[C@]34C)O)C)O
- InChI: InChI=1S/C23H32O6/c1-13(24)29-12-19(27)23(28)9-7-17-16-5-4-14-10-15(25)6-8-21(14,2)20(16)18(26)11-22(17,23)3/h10,16-18,20,26,28H,4-9,11-12H2,1-3H3/t16-,17-,18-,20+,21-,22-,23-/m0/s1; Key:ALEXXDVDDISNDU-JZYPGELDSA-N

Hydrocortisone acetate is a synthetic glucocorticoid corticosteroid and a corticosteroid ester.

The acetate group helps to protect the hydrocortisone molecule from being broken down by enzymes in the body (prolongs the duration of action of hydrocortisone) and allows it to be absorbed more easily.

== Oral bioavailability ==
Hydrocortisone has a lower bioavailability than hydrocortisone acetate when taken orally, because hydrocortisone is rapidly metabolized in the liver and excreted by the kidneys before reaching its target tissue. On the other hand, hydrocortisone acetate is more stable and less susceptible to metabolism, allowing a higher proportion of the drug to be absorbed and reach systemic circulation. Therefore, hydrocortisone acetate is often preferred for oral administration over hydrocortisone.
