= Bullous impetigo =

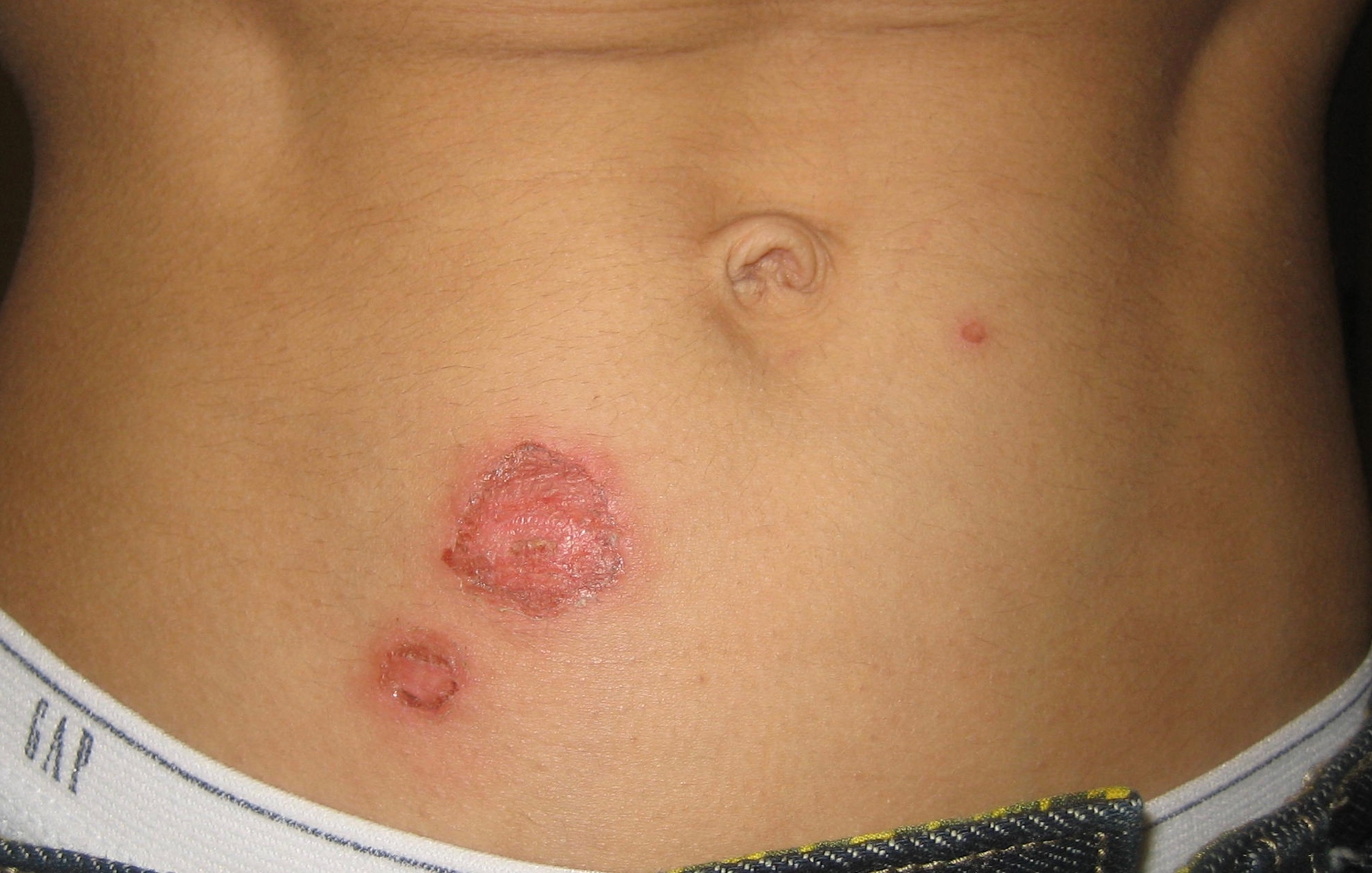
- Bullous impetigo after rupture of the bullae
- Specialty: Infectious disease/dermatology

Bullous impetigo is a bacterial skin infection caused by Staphylococcus aureus that results in the formation of large blisters called bullae, usually in areas with skin folds like the armpit, groin, between the fingers or toes, beneath the breast, and between the buttocks. It accounts for 30% of cases of impetigo, the other 70% being non-bullous impetigo.

The bullae are caused by exfoliative toxins produced by Staphylococcus aureus that cause the connections between cells in the uppermost layer of the skin to fall apart. Bullous impetigo in newborns, children, or adults who are immunocompromised and/or are experiencing kidney failure, can develop into a more severe and generalized form called staphylococcal scalded skin syndrome (SSSS). The mortality rate is less than 3% for infected children, but up to 60% in adults.

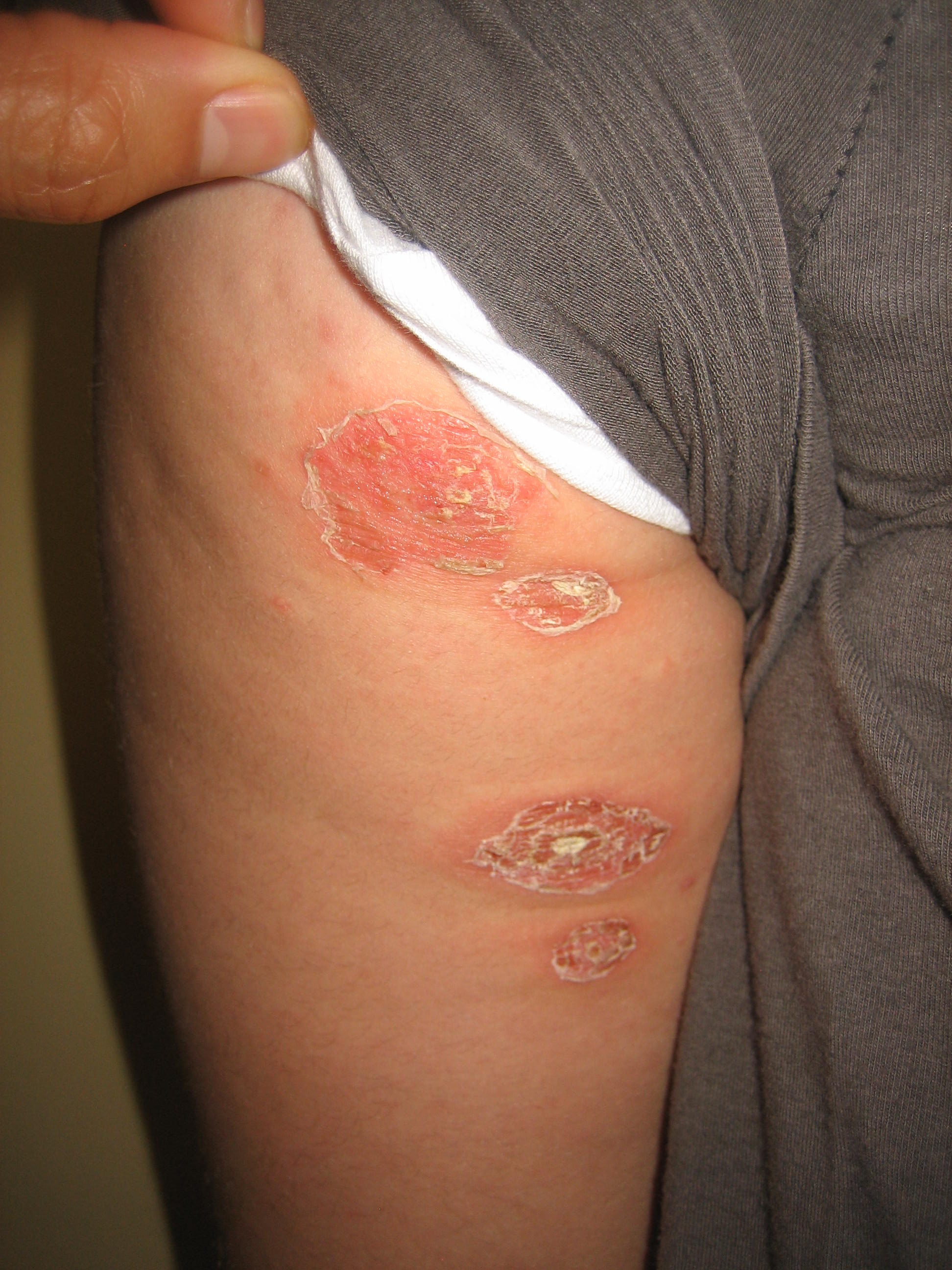
Bullous impetigo on the arm

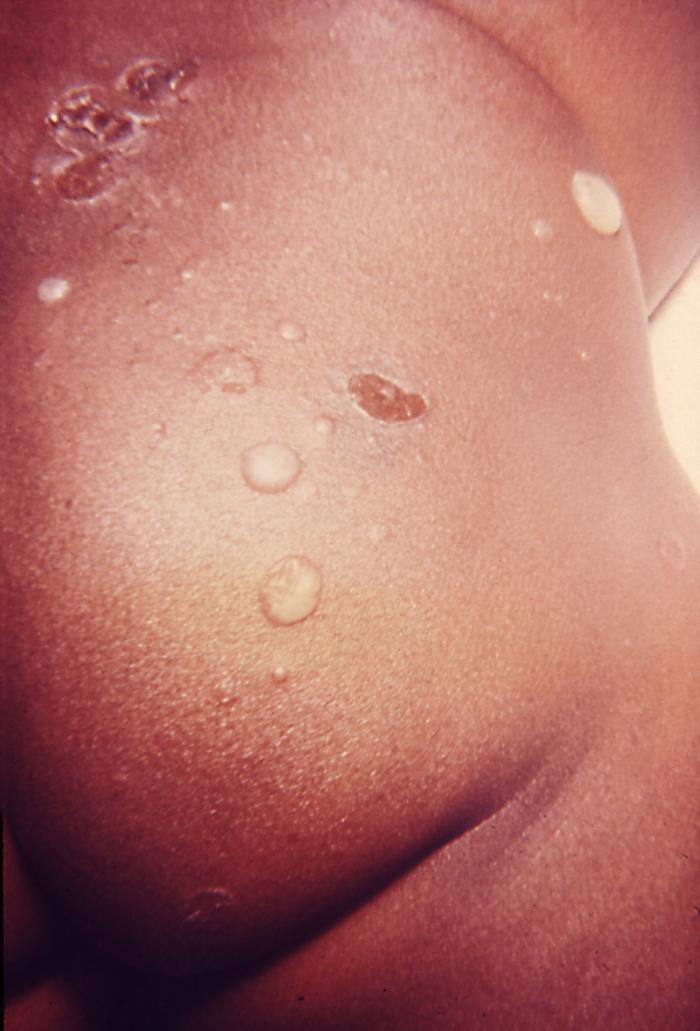
Bullous impetigo

== Cause ==
Exposure is most commonly seen in hospital wards and nurseries, and can be passed from person to person in other settings, such as close contact sports. Therefore, the patient is advised to try to limit human contact as much as possible to minimize the risk of spreading the infection.

=== Infectious period ===
After 48 hours the disease is considered no longer contagious assuming the proper antibiotic treatments have been administered.

== Pathogenesis ==
Exfoliating toxins are serine proteases that specifically bind to and cleave desmoglein 1 (Dsg1). Previous studies suggested that exfoliating toxins bind to gangliosides, causing a release of protease by keratinocytes acting as superantigens in stimulating the skin's immune system. A more recent proposal states there are three known exfoliating toxins; ETA, ETB, and ETD which act as a glutamic acid-specific serine protease with concentrated specificity. Which results in the cleavage of human Dsg1 at a unique site after glutamic acid residues causing deactivation.

=== S. aureus ===
S. aureus expresses surface receptors for fibrinogen, fibronectin, and vitronectin. These surface receptors allow a bridge to be formed which binds to host endothelial cells. Lipases allow for the degradation of lipids on the skin surface and its expression can be directly correlated with its ability of the bacteria to produce abscesses.

=== Histology ===
The epidermis is composed of four layers, stratum basale, stratum spinosum, stratum granulosum, and stratum corneum.

The cleavage plane can be found either subcorneally or within the upper stratum granulosum. The roof of the pustule is parakeratotic stratum corneum, and the floor is formed of keratinocytes, which may or may not be acantholytic. Neutrophils begin to fill the pustule. Toxins are produced by S. aureus and target desmoglein, which is a desmosomal cell-cell adhesion molecule found in the upper levels of the epidermis. This correlates with the subcorneal localization of the bullae.

=== Clinical Differential ===
- Insect bites
- bullous erythema multiforme
- fungal infections/bullous fungal
- Herpes simplex 1/2

== Management ==
Antibiotic creams are the preferred treatment for mild cases of impetigo, despite their limited systemic absorption. Such prescribed ointments include neosporin, fusidic acid, chloramphenicol and mupirocin. More severe cases of impetigo however (especially bullous impetigo) will likely require oral agents with better systemic bioavailability, such as cephalexin. Cases that do not resolve with initial antibiotic therapy or require hospitalization may also be indicative an MRSA infection, which would require consultation with a local microbiologist.

Antibiotic treatment typically last 7–10 days, and although highly effective some cases of methicillin resistant S. aureus (MRSA) may require longer therapy depending on the severity of infection and how much it has spread.

== See also ==
- Impetigo contagiosa
- Skin lesion
- List of conditions caused by problems with junctional proteins
