= Impetigo =

Human disease (bacterial infection)

- Other names: School sores, impetigo contagiosa
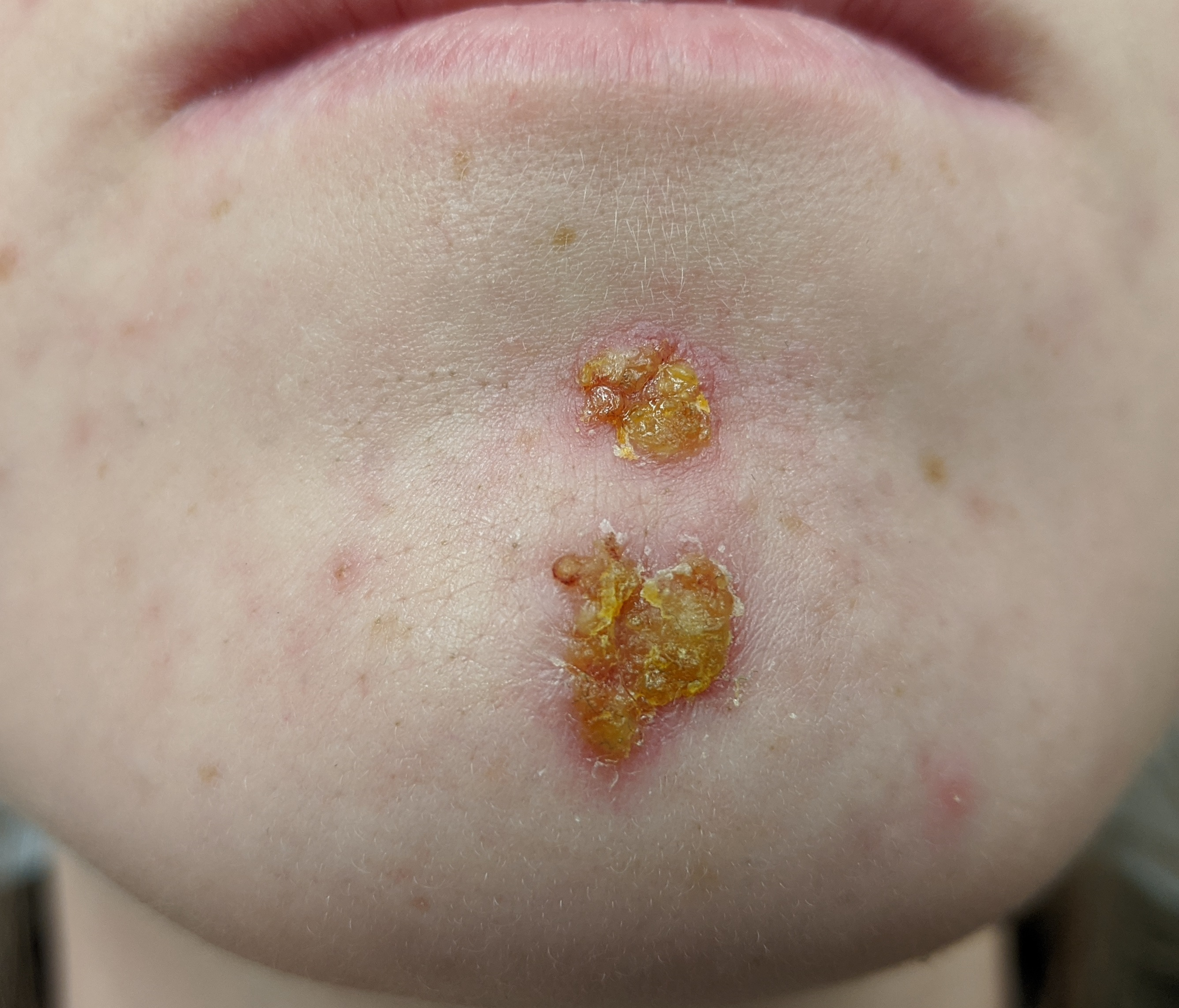
- A case of impetigo on the chin
- Pronunciation: /ɪmpɪˈtaɪɡoʊ/
- Specialty: Dermatology, infectious disease
- Symptoms: Yellowish skin crusts, painful
- Complications: Cellulitis, poststreptococcal glomerulonephritis
- Usual onset: Young children
- Duration: Less than 3 weeks
- Causes: Staphylococcus aureus or Streptococcus pyogenes which spreads by direct contact
- Risk factors: Day care, crowding, poor nutrition, diabetes mellitus, contact sports, breaks in the skin
- Prevention: Hand washing, avoiding infected people, cleaning injuries
- Treatment: Based on symptoms
- Medication: Antibiotics (mupirocin, fusidic acid, cefalexin)
- Frequency: 140 million (2010)

Impetigo is a contagious bacterial infection that involves the superficial skin. The most common presentation is yellowish crusts on the face, arms, or legs. Less commonly there may be large blisters which affect the groin or armpits. The lesions may be painful or itchy. Fever is uncommon.

It is typically due to either Staphylococcus aureus or Streptococcus pyogenes. Risk factors include attending day care, crowding, poor nutrition, diabetes mellitus, contact sports, and breaks in the skin such as from mosquito bites, eczema, scabies, or herpes. With contact it can spread around or between people. Diagnosis is typically based on the symptoms and appearance.

Prevention is by hand washing, avoiding people who are infected, and cleaning injuries. Treatment is typically with antibiotic creams such as mupirocin or fusidic acid. Antibiotics by mouth, such as cefalexin, may be used if large areas are affected. Antibiotic-resistant forms have been found. Healing generally occurs without scarring.

Impetigo affected about 140 million people (2% of the world population) in 2010. It can occur at any age, but is most common in young children aged two to five. In some places the condition is also known as "school sores". Without treatment people typically get better within three weeks. Recurring infections can occur due to colonization of the nose by the bacteria. Complications may include cellulitis or poststreptococcal glomerulonephritis. The name is from the Latin impetere meaning "attack".

== Signs and symptoms ==
=== Contagious impetigo ===
This most common form of impetigo, also called nonbullous impetigo, most often begins as a red sore near the nose or mouth which soon breaks, leaking pus or fluid, and forms a honey-colored scab, followed by a red mark which often heals without leaving a scar. Sores are not painful, but they may be itchy. Lymph nodes in the affected area may be swollen, but fever is rare. Touching or scratching the sores may easily spread the infection to other parts of the body.

Skin ulcers with redness and scarring also may result from scratching or abrading the skin.

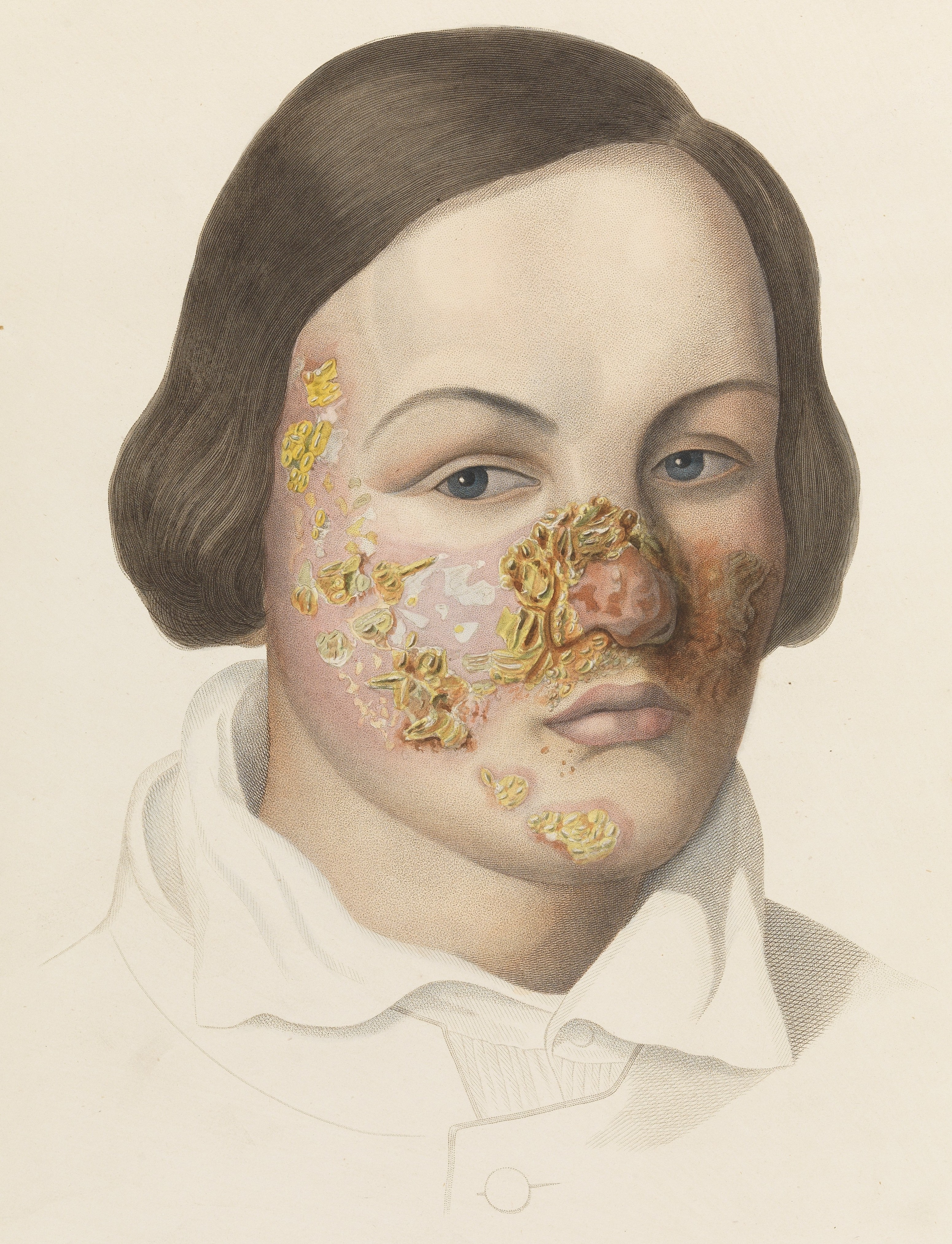
Illustration of a woman with a severe facial impetigo

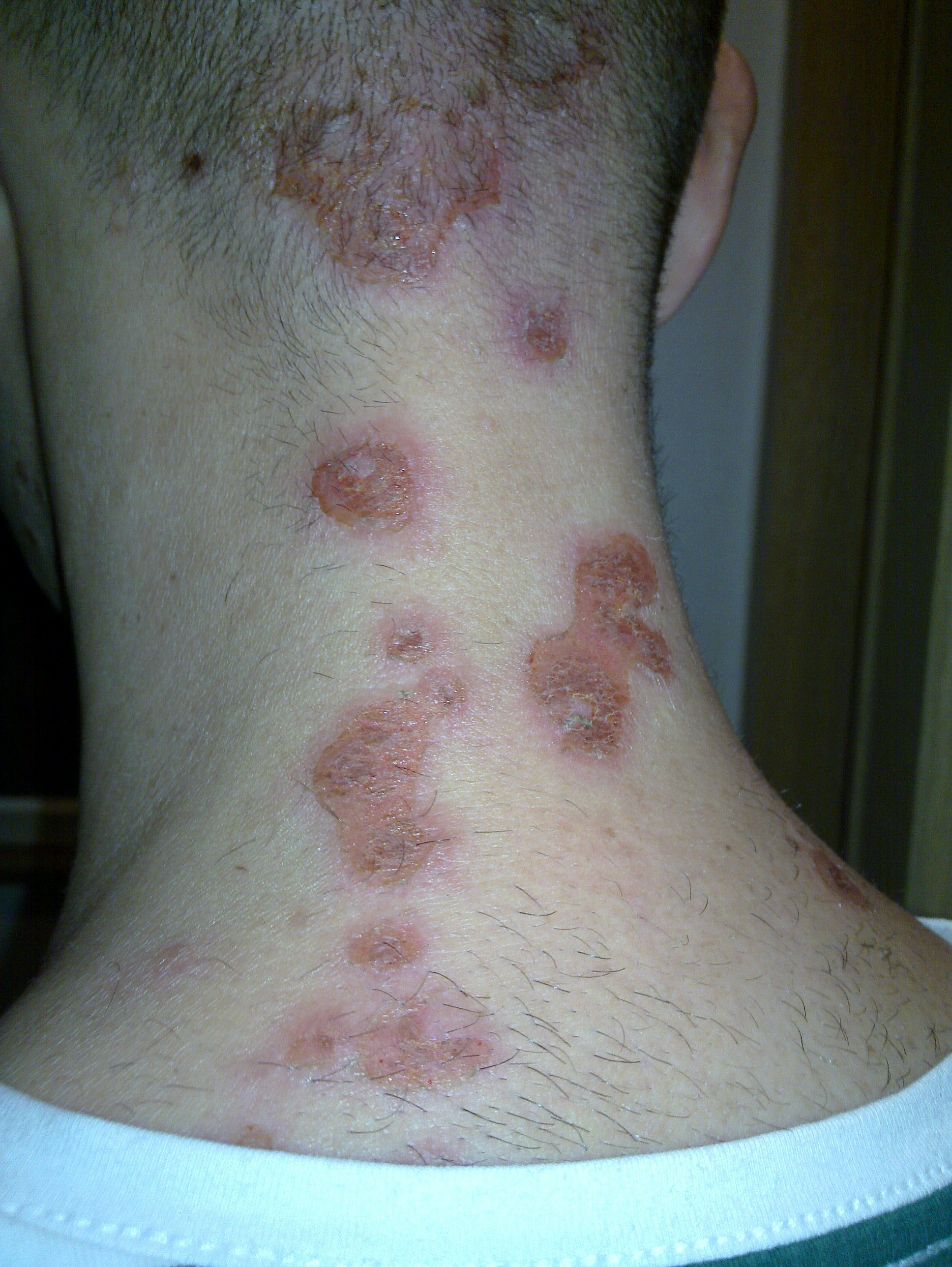
Impetigo on the back of the neck

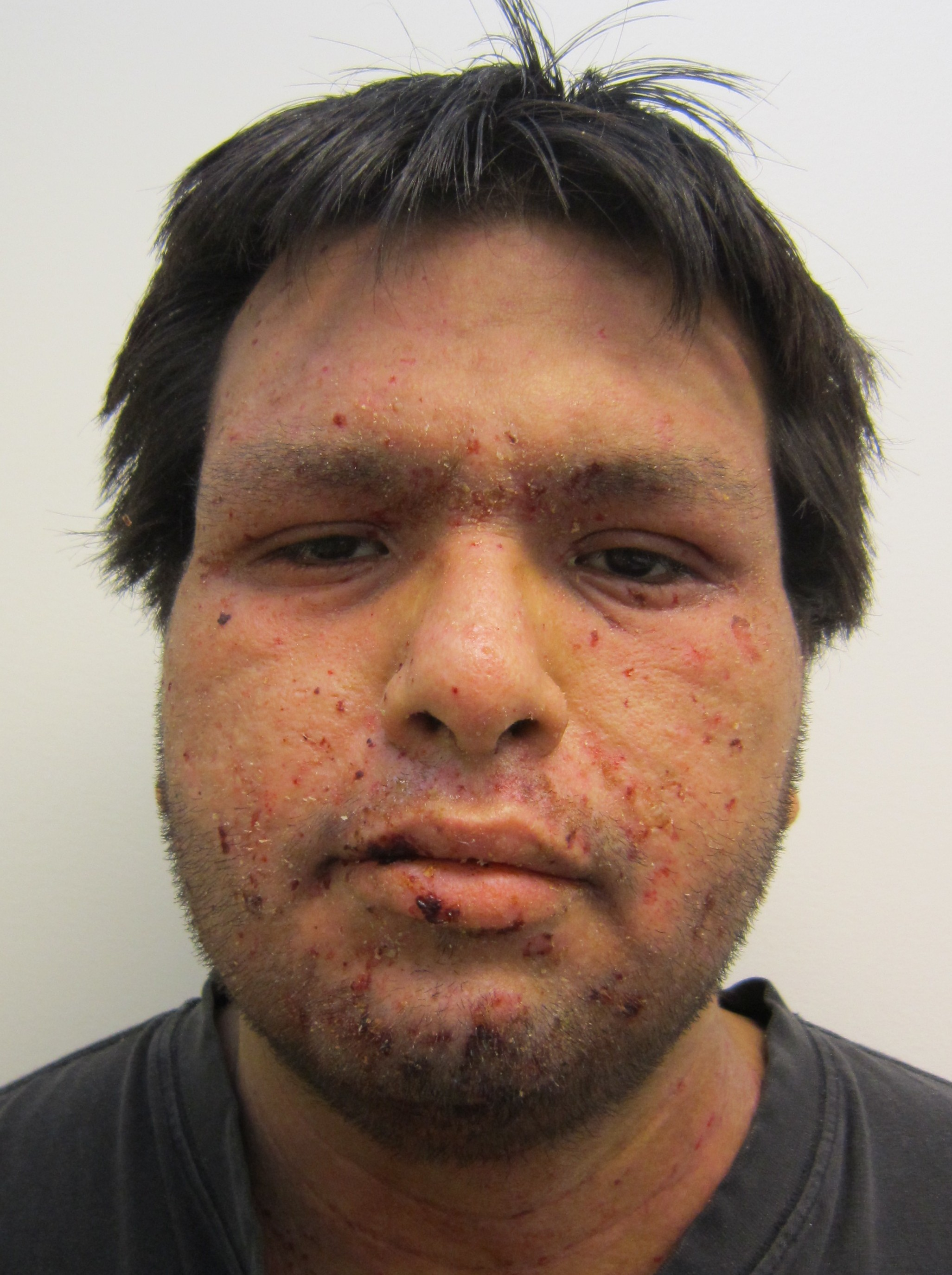
A severe case of facial impetigo

=== Bullous impetigo ===
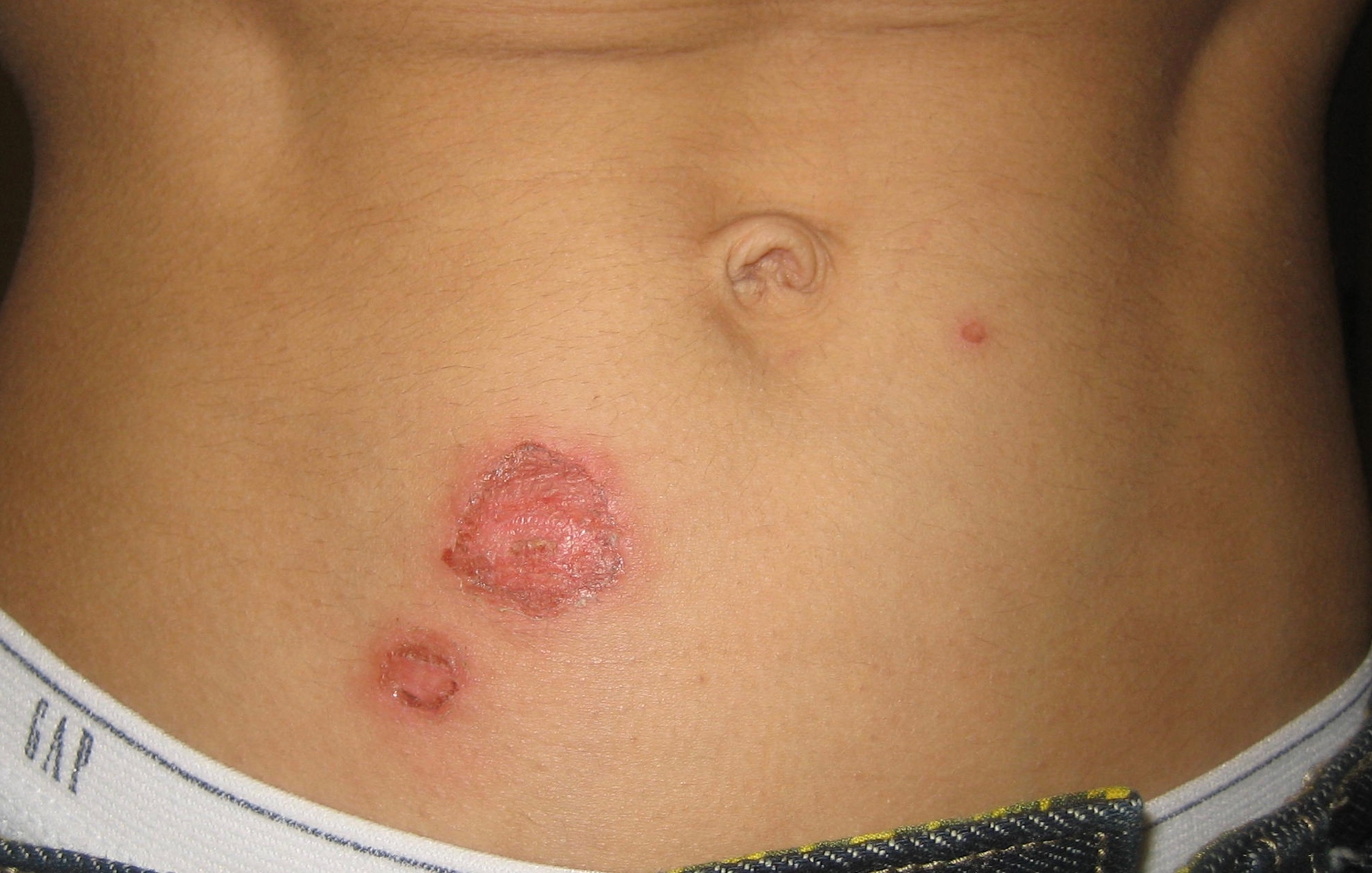
Bullous impetigo after the bullae have broken

Bullous impetigo, mainly seen in children younger than two years, involves painless, fluid-filled blisters, mostly on the arms, legs, and trunk, surrounded by red and itchy (but not sore) skin. The blisters may be large or small. After they break, they form yellow scabs.

=== Ecthyma ===
Ecthyma, the nonbullous form of impetigo, produces painful fluid- or pus-filled sores with redness of skin, usually on the arms and legs, become ulcers that penetrate deeper into the dermis. After they break open, they form hard, thick, gray-yellow scabs, which sometimes leave scars. Ecthyma may be accompanied by swollen lymph nodes in the affected area.

== Causes ==
Impetigo is primarily caused by Staphylococcus aureus, and sometimes by Streptococcus pyogenes. Both bullous and nonbullous are primarily caused by S. aureus, with Streptococcus also commonly being involved in the nonbullous form.

=== Predisposing factors ===
Impetigo is more likely to infect children ages 2–5, especially those that attend school or day care. 70% of cases are the nonbullous form and 30% are the bullous form. Impetigo occurs more frequently among people who live in warm climates.

=== Transmission ===
The infection is spread by direct contact with lesions or with nasal carriers. The incubation period is 1–3 days after exposure to Streptococcus and 4–10 days for Staphylococcus. Dried streptococci in the air are not infectious to intact skin. Scratching may spread the lesions.

== Diagnosis ==
Impetigo is usually diagnosed based on its appearance. It generally appears as honey-colored scabs formed from dried sebum and is often found on the arms, legs, or face. If a visual diagnosis is unclear a culture may be done to test for resistant bacteria.

=== Differential diagnosis ===
Other conditions that can result in symptoms similar to the common form include contact dermatitis, herpes simplex virus, discoid lupus, and scabies.

Other conditions that can result in symptoms similar to the blistering form include other bullous skin diseases, burns, and necrotizing fasciitis.

Visual progression

A visual progression section may be used to illustrate the typical development of impetigo lesions, which can assist in clinical recognition and differentiation of subtypes.

In non-bullous impetigo, early lesions typically begin as erythematous macules or papules that progress to small vesicles or pustules. These lesions subsequently rupture, resulting in the formation of characteristic honey-colored crusts.

In bullous impetigo, lesions are characterized by the rapid formation of flaccid bullae filled with clear or yellow fluid. These bullae rupture more easily than those in non-bullous forms, leaving superficial erosions and a thin crust. Surrounding erythema is often minimal compared with non-bullous impetigo.

A comparative visual representation of non-bullous and bullous impetigo may improve diagnostic accuracy and aid in distinguishing between the two forms in clinical practice.

== Prevention ==
To prevent the spread of impetigo the skin and any open wounds should be kept clean and covered. Care should be taken to keep fluids from an infected person away from the skin of a non-infected person. Washing hands, linens, and affected areas will lower the likelihood of contact with infected fluids. Scratching can spread the sores; keeping nails short will reduce the chances of spreading. Infected people should avoid contact with others and eliminate sharing of clothing or linens. Children with impetigo can return to school 24 hours after starting antibiotic therapy as long as their draining lesions are covered.

== Treatment ==
Antibiotics, either as a cream or by mouth, are usually prescribed. Mild cases may be treated with mupirocin ointments. In 95% of cases, a single seven-day antibiotic course results in resolution in children. It has been advocated that topical antiseptics are inferior to topical antibiotics, and therefore should not be used as a replacement. However, the National Institute for Health and Care Excellence (NICE) as of February 2020 recommends a hydrogen peroxide 1% cream antiseptic rather than topical antibiotics for localised non-bullous impetigo in otherwise well individuals. This recommendation is part of an effort to reduce the overuse of antimicrobials that may contribute to the development of resistant organisms such as MRSA.

More severe cases require oral antibiotics, such as dicloxacillin, flucloxacillin, or erythromycin. Alternatively, amoxicillin combined with clavulanate potassium, cephalosporins (first-generation) and many others may also be used as an antibiotic treatment. Alternatives for people who are seriously allergic to penicillin or infections with methicillin-resistant Staphococcus aureus include doxycycline, clindamycin, and trimethoprim-sulphamethoxazole, although doxycycline should not be used in children under the age of eight years old due to the risk of drug-induced tooth discolouration. When streptococci alone are the cause, penicillin is the drug of choice. When the condition presents with ulcers, valacyclovir, an antiviral, may be given in case a viral infection is causing the ulcer.

The mass administration of the drug ivermectin is sometimes used to prevent cases in high-prevalence settings such as Fiji, where impetigo is commonly a scabies sequela.

== Prognosis ==
Without treatment, individuals with impetigo typically get better within three weeks. Complications may include cellulitis or poststreptococcal glomerulonephritis. Rheumatic fever does not appear to be related.

== Epidemiology ==
Globally, impetigo affects more than 162 million children in low- to middle-income countries. The rates are highest in countries with low available resources and prevalence is especially high in Oceania. Tropical climate and high population density contribute to these rates. Children under the age of 4 in the United Kingdom had a 2.8% annual incidence, this decreased to 1.6% for children up to 15 years old, in 1991-1992. As age increases, the rate of impetigo declines, but all ages are still susceptible.

== History ==
Impetigo was originally described and differentiated by the English dermatologist William Tilbury Fox around 1864. The word impetigo is the generic Latin word for 'skin eruption', and it stems from the verb impetere 'to attack' (as in impetus). Before the discovery of antibiotics, the disease was treated with an application of the antiseptic gentian violet, which was an effective treatment.
