= Clotrimazole/betamethasone dipropionate =

Combination drug

Combination of
- Clotrimazole: Azole antifungal
- Betamethasone dipropionate: Corticosteroid

Clinical data
- Trade names: Lotrisone
- AHFS/Drugs.com: Monograph
- License data: US DailyMed: Clotrimazole and betamethasone
- Routes of administration: Topical
- ATC code: D01AC20 (WHO) S01CA05 (WHO) S03CA06 (WHO)

Legal status
- Legal status: US: ℞-only

Identifiers
- KEGG: D10300

Clotrimazole/betamethasone dipropionate, sold under the brand name Lotrisone among others, is a topical medication used for the treatment of fungal infections of the feet, groin, and body in people 17 years of age and older. It is a combination of clotrimazole and betamethasone dipropionate. It is applied to the skin.

Common side effects include paresthesia, rash, edema, and secondary infections.

In 2023, it was the 241st most commonly prescribed medication in the United States, with more than 1 million prescriptions.

== Medical uses ==
Clotrimazole/betamethasone dipropionate is indicated for the topical treatment of symptomatic inflammatory tinea pedis, tinea cruris, and tinea corporis due to Epidermophyton floccosum, Trichophyton mentagrophytes, and Trichophyton rubrum in people 17 years of age and older.

== Society and culture ==
=== Legal status ===
Clotrimazole/betamethasone dipropionate cream was approved for medical use in the United States in July 1984, and the lotion was approved for use in the United States in December 2000.
