= Betamethasone =

Steroid medication

- Molecular structure of betamethasone

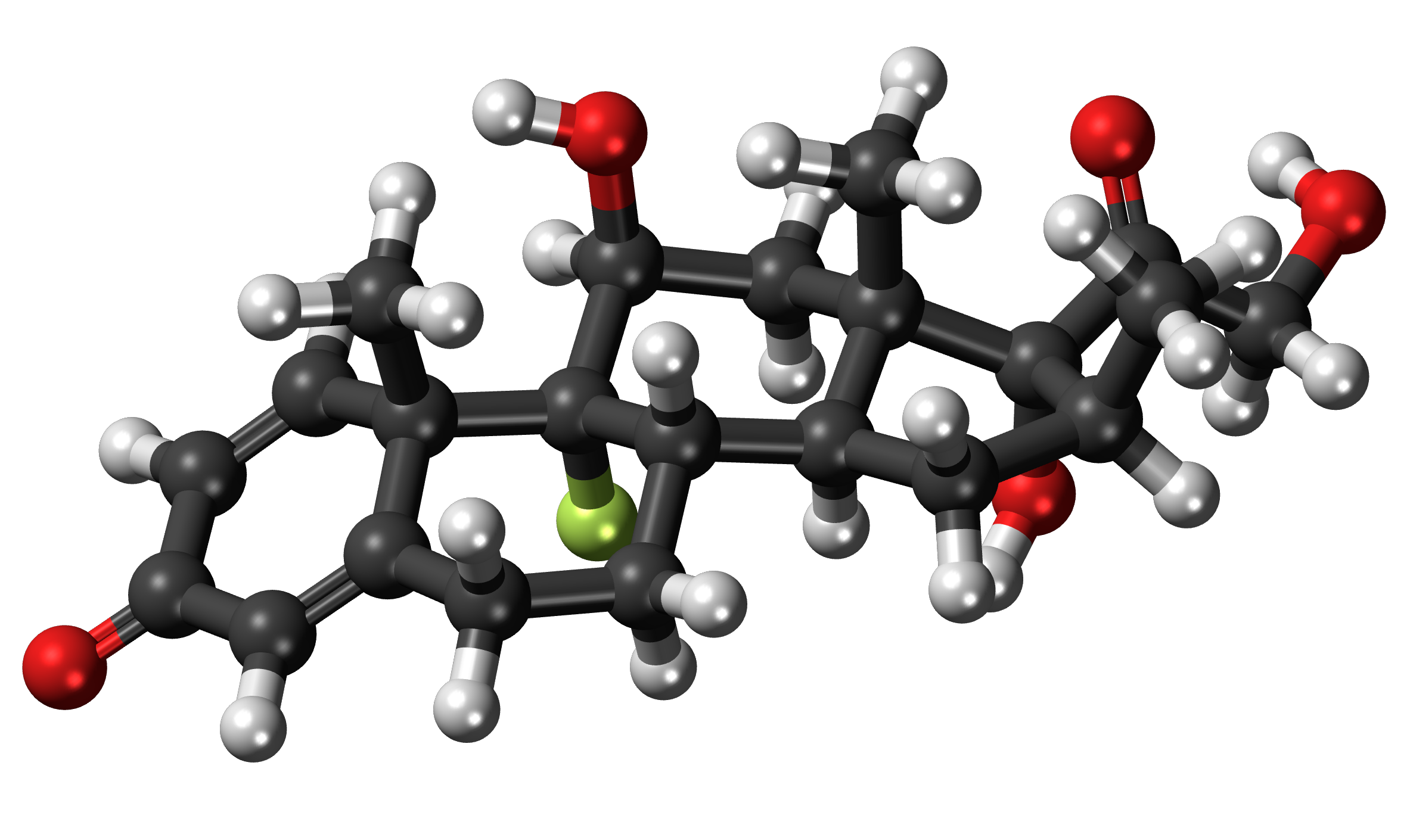
- 3D representation of a betamethasone molecule

Clinical data
- Trade names: Celestone, Eleuphrat, others
- AHFS/Drugs.com: Monograph
- MedlinePlus: a682799
- License data: US DailyMed: Betamethasone
- Pregnancy category: AU: C
- Routes of administration: By mouth, topical, intramuscular
- ATC code: A07EA04 (WHO) C05AA05 (WHO) D07AC01 (WHO) D07BC01 (WHO) D07CC01 (WHO) D07XC01 (WHO) H02AB01 (WHO) R01AD06 (WHO) R03BA04 (WHO) S01BA06 (WHO) S01BB04 (WHO) S01CA05 (WHO) S01CB04 (WHO) S02BA07 (WHO) S03BA03 (WHO) S03CA06 (WHO)

Legal status
- Legal status: AU: S4 (Prescription only); UK: POM (Prescription only); US: ℞-only; In general: ℞ (Prescription only)

Pharmacokinetic data
- Metabolism: Liver CYP3A4
- Elimination half-life: 36-54 hours
- Excretion: Kidney (in urine)

Identifiers
- IUPAC name: (8S,9R,10S,11S,13S,14S,16S,17R)-9-Fluoro- 11,17-dihydroxy-17-(2-hydroxyacetyl)-10,13,16-trimethyl- 6,7,8,9,10,11,12,13,14,15,16,17-dodecahydro- 3H-cyclopenta[a]phenanthren-3-one
- CAS Number: 378-44-9
- PubChem CID: 9782
- IUPHAR/BPS: 7061
- DrugBank: DB00443
- ChemSpider: 9399
- UNII: 9842X06Q6M
- KEGG: D00244
- ChEBI: CHEBI:3077
- ChEMBL: ChEMBL632
- CompTox Dashboard (EPA): DTXSID3022667
- ECHA InfoCard: 100.006.206

Chemical and physical data
- Formula: C_{22}H_{29}FO_{5}
- Molar mass: 392.467 g·mol^{−1}
- 3D model (JSmol): Interactive image
- SMILES: O=C(CO)[C@]3(O)[C@]2(C[C@H](O)[C@]4(F)[C@@]/1(\C(=C/C(=O)\C=C\1)CC[C@H]4[C@@H]2C[C@@H]3C)C)C
- InChI: InChI=1S/C22H29FO5/c1-12-8-16-15-5-4-13-9-14(25)6-7-19(13,2)21(15,23)17(26)10-20(16,3)22(12,28)18(27)11-24/h6-7,9,12,15-17,24,26,28H,4-5,8,10-11H2,1-3H3/t12-,15-,16-,17-,19-,20-,21-,22-/m0/s1; Key:UREBDLICKHMUKA-DVTGEIKXSA-N

Betamethasone is a steroid medication. It is used for a number of diseases including rheumatic disorders such as rheumatoid arthritis and systemic lupus erythematosus, skin diseases such as dermatitis and psoriasis, allergic conditions such as asthma and angioedema, preterm labor to speed the development of the baby's lungs, Crohn's disease, cancers such as leukemia, and along with fludrocortisone for adrenocortical insufficiency, among others. It can be taken by mouth, injected into a muscle, or applied to the skin, typically in cream, lotion, or liquid forms.

Serious side effects include an increased risk of infection, muscle weakness, severe allergic reactions, and psychosis. Long-term use may cause adrenal insufficiency. Stopping the medication suddenly following long-term use may be dangerous. The cream commonly results in increased hair growth and skin irritation. Betamethasone belongs to the glucocorticoid class of medication. It is a stereoisomer of dexamethasone, the two compounds differing only in the spatial configuration of the methyl group at position 16 (see steroid nomenclature).

Betamethasone was patented in 1958, and approved for medical use in the United States in 1961. It is on the World Health Organization's List of Essential Medicines. It is available as a generic medication. In 2023, it was the 280th most commonly prescribed medication in the United States, with more than 700,000 prescriptions.

== Medical uses ==
Betnovate ointment

Betamethasone is a corticosteroid that is available as a pill, by injection, and as an ointment, cream, lotion, gel, or aerosol (spray) for the skin, and a foam for the scalp. When given by injection, anti-inflammatory effects begin in around two hours and last for seven days.

It is used as a topical cream to relieve skin irritation, such as itching and flaking from eczema. It is used as a treatment for local psoriasis, as betamethasone dipropionate and salicylic acid, or as the combination calcipotriol/betamethasone dipropionate. Betamethasone sodium phosphate is used orally and via injection with the same indications as other steroids. Many betamethasone-based pharmaceuticals include the steroid as the valerate ester.

In a randomized controlled trial betamethasone was shown to reduce some of the ataxia (poor coordination) symptoms associated with ataxia telangiectasia (A-T) by 28-31%.

Betamethasone is also used to stimulate fetal maturation of the lungs and cerebral blood vessels.

A cream with 0.05% betamethasone appears effective in treating phimosis in boys, and often averts the need for circumcision. Longer-term research is needed on this treatment method. This approach has replaced circumcision as the preferred treatment method for some physicians in the British National Health Service.

== Side effects ==
- Euphoria
- Depression
- Adrenal suppression
- Hypertension
- Groupings of fine blood vessels becoming prominent under the skin, petechiae
- Excessive hair growth (hypertrichosis)
- Ecchymoses

Betamethasone crosses the placenta.

When injected into the epidural space or the spine, it may cause serious side effects like loss of vision, stroke, and paralysis.

== Forms ==
Betamethasone is available in a number of compound forms: betamethasone dipropionate (branded as Diprosone, Diprolene, Celestamine, Procort (in Pakistan), and others), betamethasone sodium phosphate (branded as Bentelan in Italy) and betamethasone valerate (branded as Audavate, Betnovate, Celestone, Fucibet, and others). In the United States and Canada, betamethasone is mixed with clotrimazole and sold as Lotrisone and Lotriderm. It is also available in combination with salicylic acid (branded as Diprosalic) for using in psoriatic skin conditions. In some countries, it is also sold mixed with both clotrimazole and gentamicin to add an antibacterial agent to the mix.

Betamethasone sodium phosphate mixed with betamethasone acetate is available in the United States as Celestone Soluspan.

== See also ==
- Betamethasone/dexchlorpheniramine
