= Betamethasone valerate =

Chemical compound

Clinical data
- Trade names: Betnovate, Celestoderm, Ecoval 70, Hormezon
- Other names: Betamethasone 17-valerate
- AHFS/Drugs.com: Monograph
- Drug class: Corticosteroid; glucocorticoid

Identifiers
- IUPAC name: (11β,16β)-9-Fluoro-11,21-dihydroxy-16-methyl-3,20-dioxopregna-1,4-dien-17-yl valerate
- CAS Number: 2152-44-5
- PubChem CID: 16533
- ChemSpider: 15673
- UNII: 9IFA5XM7R2
- ChEBI: CHEBI:31277
- ChEMBL: ChEMBL1497
- CompTox Dashboard (EPA): DTXSID7022673
- ECHA InfoCard: 100.016.764

Chemical and physical data
- Formula: C_{27}H_{37}FO_{6}
- Molar mass: 476.585 g·mol^{−1}
- 3D model (JSmol): Interactive image
- SMILES: CCCCC(=O)O[C@@]1([C@H](C[C@@H]2[C@@]1(C[C@@H]([C@]3([C@H]2CCC4=CC(=O)C=C[C@@]43C)F)O)C)C)C(=O)CO
- InChI: InChI=1S/C27H37FO6/c1-5-6-7-23(33)34-27(22(32)15-29)16(2)12-20-19-9-8-17-13-18(30)10-11-24(17,3)26(19,28)21(31)14-25(20,27)4/h10-11,13,16,19-21,29,31H,5-9,12,14-15H2,1-4H3/t16-,19-,20-,21-,24-,25-,26-,27-/m0/s1; Key:SNHRLVCMMWUAJD-SUYDQAKGSA-N

Betamethasone valerate is a synthetic glucocorticoid ester. It is the 17-valerate ester of betamethasone. Betamethasone valerate is often used to treat mild eczema with good efficacy and lower incidence of steroid induced adverse effects due to its lower potency compared to other glucocorticoids. Betamethasone-17-valerate is available in cream, ointment, lotion, and foam preparations for topical use.

== See also ==
- Fusidic acid/betamethasone valerate
