= Betamethasone/dexchlorpheniramine =

Combination drug for allergies

Combination of
- Betamethasone: Corticosteroid
- Dexchlorpheniramine: Antihistamine

Clinical data
- ATC code: R06AB52 (WHO)

Identifiers
- CAS Number: 62682-62-6
- PubChem CID: 56843333

Betamethasone/dexchlorpheniramine (trade names Betadexin, Celabet, Celestamine, Ocuson) is a drug containing betamethasone and dexchlorpheniramine maleate to treat allergic conditions. Betamethasone is a steroid to relieve itches and inflammation while dexchlorpheniramine maleate is an antihistamine to treat urticaria.
