= Fusidium =

Scientific classification
- Kingdom: Fungi
- Division: Ascomycota
- Class: Sordariomycetes
- Order: Hypocreales
- Family: Nectriaceae
- Genus: Fusidium

Species
- Fusidium adoxae Fusidium aeruginosum Fusidium agrostidis Fusidium ajugae Fusidium albidum Fusidium albocarneum Fusidium album Fusidium anceps Fusidium anchusae Fusidium angelicae Fusidium arundinis Fusidium asteris Fusidium aurantiacum Fusidium aureum Fusidium banksianum Fusidium behenis Fusidium betae Fusidium bonordenii Fusidium botryoideum Fusidium bruchianum Fusidium bryoniae Fusidium bulgaricum Fusidium buxi Fusidium caesium Fusidium candidulum Fusidium candidum Fusidium canum Fusidium carneolum Fusidium cavaraeanum Fusidium clandestinum Fusidium coccineum Fusidium coniosporiicola Fusidium conorum Fusidium crataevae Fusidium curvatum Fusidium cylindricum Fusidium cylindrospora Fusidium dendriticum Fusidium deutziae Fusidium donacinum Fusidium eburneum Fusidium elegantulum Fusidium epidermidis Fusidium expansum Fusidium farina Fusidium fasciculatum Fusidium flagelliforme Fusidium flavovirens Fusidium fumago Fusidium geranii Fusidium granulatum Fusidium griseliniae Fusidium griseum Fusidium haplotrichi Fusidium heteronemum Fusidium hieracii Fusidium hormiscii Fusidium hypodermium Fusidium hypophleodes Fusidium hypophleoides Fusidium hysteriiforme Fusidium inaequale Fusidium juglandis Fusidium leonuri Fusidium leptospermum Fusidium longisporum Fusidium lycotropum Fusidium maesae Fusidium magellanicum Fusidium maritimum Fusidium melampyri Fusidium microspermum Fusidium microsporum Fusidium mimosae Fusidium mirabile Fusidium moehringiae Fusidium obtusatum Fusidium olivaceum Fusidium pallidum Fusidium parasiticum Fusidium patellatum Fusidium peronosporae Fusidium persicinum Fusidium petasitidis Fusidium piri Fusidium pirinum Fusidium potentillae Fusidium pteridis Fusidium pulveraceum Fusidium pulvinatum Fusidium punctiforme Fusidium pyrinum Fusidium ranunculi Fusidium ravenelianum Fusidium rhodospermum Fusidium roseum Fusidium salmonicolor Fusidium septonematis Fusidium sericeum Fusidium sphaceliae Fusidium sphaeriae-chioneae Fusidium squamicola Fusidium stachydis Fusidium stilbophilum Fusidium sulphureum Fusidium tenuissimum Fusidium terricola Fusidium torulosum Fusidium tumescens Fusidium udum Fusidium udum Fusidium vaccinii Fusidium verrucosum Fusidium violaceum Fusidium virens Fusidium viride

Genus of fungi

Fusidium is a genus of fungi. The bacteriostatic antibiotic fusidic acid is derived from Fusidium coccineum.
