= Taksta =

Oral dosing drug regimen

Taksta (previously CEM-102) is a front-loaded oral dosing regimen of sodium fusidate under development in the U.S. as an antibiotic for gram-positive infections including drug-resistant strains such as methicillin-resistant Staphylococcus aureus.

== Clinical trials ==
Jan 2010: Taksta has completed enrollment in a phase 2 trial (due to run until March 2010) and is preparing for phase 3 studies in the U.S. for acute bacterial skin structure infections (being compared with linezolid).

Sep 2010: Taksta demonstrated comparable clinical success rates compared to linezolid in a phase 2 trial in the U.S. for acute bacterial skin and skin structure infections.

Jun 2011: Taksta may be effective in the treatment of chronic prosthetic joint infections and osteomyelitis.

Dec 2015: Cempra doses first patient in a phase 3 clinical trial of Taksta in acute bacterial skin and skin structure infections.

Nov 2016: Cempra completes a phase 3 clinical trial of Taksta in acute bacterial skin and skin structure infections. Results remain pending.

Feb 2017: Cempra achieves the primary endpoint of a 10% non-inferiority margin. The microbiological success in each ME population with methicillin-resistant S. aureus infection is 100 percent (99/99) at both the EOT and PTE visits.

== See also ==
- Fusidic acid, licensed for some decades outside the US and is in clinical development in the U.S.
