= Fusidic acid/betamethasone valerate =

Combination drug and medical cream for skin

Combination of
- Fusidic acid: antibiotic
- Betamethasone valerate: corticosteroid

Clinical data
- Trade names: Fucibet

Legal status
- Legal status: CA: ℞-only; UK: POM (Prescription only)

Identifiers
- CAS Number: 340996-94-3

Fusidic acid/betamethasone valerate is a combination drug with the active ingredients being fusidic acid (an antibiotic) and betamethasone valerate (a corticosteroid). It is a medical cream used for treatment of skin inflammation, eczema, or dermatitis that is also infected with bacteria sensitive to fusidic acid.
