= Calcipotriol/betamethasone dipropionate =

Combination drug

Combination of
- Calcipotriol: Vitamin D_{3} analog
- Betamethasone dipropionate: Corticosteroid

Clinical data
- Trade names: Taclonex, Enstilar, Dovobet, others
- AHFS/Drugs.com: Professional Drug Facts
- Pregnancy category: AU: B3
- Routes of administration: Topical
- ATC code: D05AX52 (WHO)

Legal status
- Legal status: AU: S4 (Prescription only); CA: ℞-only; UK: POM (Prescription only); US: ℞-only

Identifiers
- CAS Number: 485805-18-3
- PubChem CID: 9832804
- KEGG: D10534

Calcipotriol/betamethasone dipropionate, sold under the brand name Taclonex among others, is a fixed-dose combination medication of the synthetic vitamin D_{3} analog calcipotriol (also known as calcipotriene) and the synthetic corticosteroid betamethasone dipropionate for the treatment of plaque psoriasis. It is provided in the form of ointment, topical suspension/ gel, aerosol foam and cream.

Ointment and topical suspensions are both available as a generic medication.

== Medical uses ==
Calcipotriol/betamethasone dipropionate (Cal/BD) is a topical medication for the treatment of trunk, limb, and scalp plaque psoriasis. This medication is available in ointment, gel, aerosol foam, or cream, formulations. The ointment formulation (Dovobet/ Daivobet) was FDA approved in 2004, and is indicated for the once daily topical treatment of plaque-type psoriasis vulgaris amenable to topical therapy. The topical suspension (Taclonex) was approved by the FDA in 2008 for the treatment of plaque psoriasis in patients aged 18 and over and for the treatment of scalp psoriasis in patients aged 12 to 17 in 2014. The foam formulation (Enstilar) was approved by the FDA in 2015, and is indicated for the topical treatment of plaque psoriasis in patients twelve years of age and older. The cream formulation (Wynzora) was approved by the FDA in 2020, and is indicated for the once daily topical treatment of plaque psoriasis in patients 18 years and older.

In all pivotal trials of calcipotriol/betamethasone dipropionate ointment, topical suspension, foam, or cream, treatment success or achievement of 'clear' or 'almost clear' disease was defined by Investigator's Global Assessment, an alternative to the Psoriasis Area and Severity Index (PASI) score.

== Contraindications ==
Calcipotriol/betamethasone dipropionate is contraindicated in patients with hypersensitivity to either glucocorticoids or vitamin D or disorders in calcium metabolism. This drug is also contraindicated for patients with erythrodermic, exfoliative, or pustular psoriasis.

== Adverse effects ==
A number of clinical studies have been conducted to investigate possible adverse events of this fixed combination corticosteroid and vitamin D analog. Safety and tolerability of calcipotriol/betamethasone dipropionate (Cal/BD) ointment has been assessed in a combined total of 2448 patients, exposed to treatment for 4 or 8 weeks (median weekly dose of 24.5 g). The most common adverse events for patients receiving Cal/BD were pruritus (3.1%), headache (2.8%), and nasopharyngitis (2.3%). Lesional/perilesional adverse events, defined as an adverse event located ≤2 cm from the lesional border, were reported by 8.7% of patients treated with Cal/BD ointment. Median time to onset of lesional/perilesional adverse events was 7 days.

Adverse events during treatment with the foam formulation have been evaluated in three 4-week randomized, multicenter, prospective vehicle- and/or active-controlled clinical trials of subjects with plaque psoriasis. The median weekly dose was 24.8 g. Application site irritation, application site pruritus (itching), folliculitis (inflammation of hair follicles), skin hypopigmentation (loss of skin color), hypercalcemia (increased blood calcium levels), urticaria, and exacerbation of psoriasis were reported in <1% of subjects. Local long-term adverse effects of continuous steroid exposure may include skin atrophy, stretch marks, telangiectasia (spider veins), dryness, local infections, and miliaria ("prickly heat").

== Pharmacology ==
=== Combined therapy ===
The use of calcipotriol with a potent corticosteroid was recognised as a useful combination for the treatment for plaque psoriasis in the 1990s, showing superiority to monotherapy through a synergy of the different modes of action. Calcipotriol acts to control keratinocyte turnover and differentiation, and BD targets inflammation and reduces local irritation associated with calcipotriol monotherapy. Furthermore, the combined therapy induces a steroid-sparing effect, reducing the risk of skin atrophy and skin thinning associated with long term topical corticosteroid use.

=== Pharmacodynamics ===
==== Hypothalamic-pituitary-adrenal axis suppression ====
In a small study of calcipotriol/betamethasone dipropionate (Cal/BD) ointment once-daily for 4 weeks, no patients (N=11 tested) demonstrated adrenal suppression defined as 30-minute post-stimulation cortisol level ≤18 mcg/dL. In two other studies of Cal/BD ointment, 1 patient of 19 (5.3%) had adrenal suppression, as did 5 patients of 32 (15.6%) after 4 weeks of treatment. In the latter study, it may be noted that patients used Cal/BD ointment on the body in addition to Cal/BD topical suspension on the scalp.

Potential effects on hypothalamic-pituitary-adrenal (HPA axis) function of the foam formulation were evaluated in a clinical trial of adults (N=35) with moderate to severe plaque psoriasis covering a mean of 18% of the body surface area of the trunk and limbs and 50% of the scalp. The foam was applied once daily to all lesions on the trunk, limbs and scalp for 4 weeks. Mean (range) weekly exposure was 62 (13.5–113) g. After 4 weeks, no patient exhibited adrenal suppression, defined as a cortisol level ≤497 nmol/L 30 minutes after adrenocorticotropic hormone challenge. Lack of adrenal suppression over the course of four weeks does not preclude the possibility of HPA axis suppression during prolonged exposure.

==== Effects on calcium metabolism ====
In patients treated with both calcipotriol/betamethasone dipropionate (Cal/BD) ointment on the body and Cal/BD topical suspension on the scalp (n=35), 1 patient (2.9%) had elevated urinary calcium levels after 4 weeks of treatment.

Three studies of Cal/BD topical suspension have evaluated treatment effects on calcium metabolism. In 2 of the 3 trials (n=32 and n=43), elevated urinary calcium levels outside the normal range were observed in 2 patients each. In the third trial (n=109), no clinically relevant changes in urinary calcium were reported.

Potential effects on calcium metabolism have been evaluated in three randomized, multicenter, prospective, vehicle- and/or active-controlled trials of the foam formulation enrolling 564 adults with plaque psoriasis. The foam was applied once daily for four weeks. In these trials, three subjects had serum calcium levels elevated above the upper limit of normal. Urinary calcium elevations above normal were reported in 17 subjects.

In a published multicenter, open-label, single-arm trial of the foam formulation, 35 adults with plaque psoriasis applied the foam once daily to all lesions on the trunk, limbs, and scalp for four weeks. No elevations of serum calcium, urinary calcium, or the ratio of urinary calcium to creatinine above the upper limit of normal were observed.

== History ==
=== Formulation challenge ===
Corticosteroids such as betamethasone dipropionate are stable under acidic conditions (pH 4 to 6), whereas calcipotriol requires a pH of above 8 to be stable in an aqueous environment. This presented a technological challenge to the development of a cream formulation. The drugs were initially used by patients as separate creams or ointments, applying one treatment in the morning and the other in the evening. Adherence issues and consequential potential poor patient care outcomes were observed using this regime.

=== Non-aqueous formulations ===
To alleviate the pH compatibility issue and to enable a single combination formulation to be developed, a non-aqueous, non-alcoholic ointment was developed by LEO Pharma. This was approved in 2006 by the US Food and Drug Administration (FDA) for the treatment of psoriasis vulgaris in patients aged 18 years and older. The superiority and improved convenience of this therapy was demonstrated in clinical trials.

Further developments in the formulation focused on non-aqueous medicines with improved aesthetic appeal. The topical suspension/ gel formulation (Taclonex), a less viscous preparation than Dovobet, was approved by the FDA in 2008, for the treatment of plaque psoriasis of the scalp and body in adults 18 years and older. In 2014, the FDA also approved the topical suspension formulation for the treatment of plaque psoriasis of the scalp in adolescents aged 12 to 17 years. The ointment and topical suspension formulation (Daivobet) were also approved in 2010 by the European Medicines Agency for the treatment of plaque psoriasis where it is possible to use a topical medication (ointment), and for the treatment of scalp psoriasis or mild to moderate plaque psoriasis on the body (topical suspension).

The aerosol foam formulation (Enstilar) was approved in October 2015, by the U.S. Food and Drug Administration. This formulation demonstrated improved efficacy in terms of skin clearance compared with the ointment and gel formulations. The efficacy of this formulation is a result of the supersaturation of the drugs in the skin, leading to improved in vitro skin penetration and bioavailability.

=== Cream formulation ===
A cream formulation (Wynzora) which overcame the pH incompatibility issue was approved by the FDA in 2020 for mild to moderate plaque psoriasis on the body, including the scalp. As with the aerosol foam formulation, this was seen to be superior to the ointment and gel formulations. A comparative anchored analysis of published trials showed that the cream was as effective as the aerosol foam. Patient preference for the cream formulation over the foam was suggested in further trials, which would lead to improved patient compliance and so improve patient treatment outcome.
