= ATC code S03 =

Pharmaceutical drug classification

ATC code S03 Ophthalmological and otological preparations is a therapeutic subgroup of the Anatomical Therapeutic Chemical Classification System, a system of alphanumeric codes developed by the World Health Organization (WHO) for the classification of drugs and other medical products. Subgroup S03 is part of the anatomical group S Sensory organs.

Codes for veterinary use (ATCvet codes) can be created by placing the letter Q in front of the human ATC code: for example, QS03.
National versions of the ATC classification may include additional codes not present in this list, which follows the WHO version.

== S03A Anti-infectives ==
=== S03AA Anti-infectives ===
S03AA01 Neomycin
S03AA02 Tetracycline
S03AA03 Polymyxin B
S03AA04 Chlorhexidine
S03AA05 Hexamidine
S03AA06 Gentamicin
S03AA07 Ciprofloxacin
S03AA08 Chloramphenicol
S03AA30 Antiinfectives, combinations

== S03B Corticosteroids ==
=== S03BA Corticosteroids ===
S03BA01 Dexamethasone
S03BA02 Prednisolone
S03BA03 Betamethasone

== S03C Corticosteroids and anti-infectives in combination ==
=== S03CA Corticosteroids and anti-infectives in combination ===
S03CA01 Dexamethasone and antiinfectives
S03CA02 Prednisolone and antiinfectives
S03CA04 Hydrocortisone and antiinfectives
S03CA05 Fludrocortisone and antiinfectives
S03CA06 Betamethasone and antiinfectives
S03CA07 Methylprednisolone and antiinfectives

== S03D Other ophthalmological and otological preparations ==
Empty group
