= C11H15ClO2 =

The molecular formula C_{11}H_{15}ClO_{2} (molar mass: 214.69 g/mol, exact mass: 214.0761 u) may refer to:

- Metaglycodol
- Phenaglycodol
