= C18H17FN2O =

The molecular formula C_{18}H_{17}FN_{2}O (molar mass: 296.339 g/mol, exact mass: 296.1325 u) may refer to:

- Didesmethylcitalopram
- Fluproquazone
