= C24H32N2O5 =

The molecular formula C_{24}H_{32}N_{2}O_{5} may refer to:

- Bedoradrine
- Falipamil
