= C12H8Cl2O2S =

The molecular formula C_{12}H_{8}Cl_{2}O_{2}S may refer to:

- 4,4'-Dichlorodiphenyl sulfone
- Fenticlor
