= List of phenethylamine precursors =

Wikimedia list article

Chemical diagram of phenethylamine (PEA)

This is a list of chemical precursors or intermediates acting as precursors in the synthesis of drugs belonging to the phenethylamine class.

Phenethylamine (PEA) itself is an organic compound, a naturally occurring biogenic amine, and a neurotransmitter. It has been produced industrially via several methods, the most well-known of which involve benzyl cyanide or the decarboxylation of phenylalanine. Phenethylamine can also be obtained from β-nitrostyrene.

== Amphetamines ==
Common synthesis routes

Synthesis of phenylacetone (P2P) from phenylacetic acid

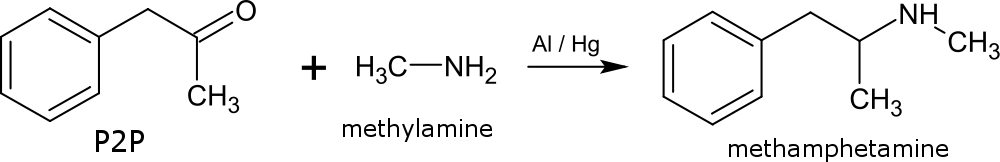
Synthesis of methamphetamine from P2P via reductive amination

Synthesis of amphetamine via P2NP

Synthesis of amphetamine via (2-chloropropyl)benzene

Ritter synthesis of amphetamine from allylbenzene

Amphetamine Knoevenagel synthesis from benzaldehyde

Synthesis of P2P from trans-Propenylbenzene

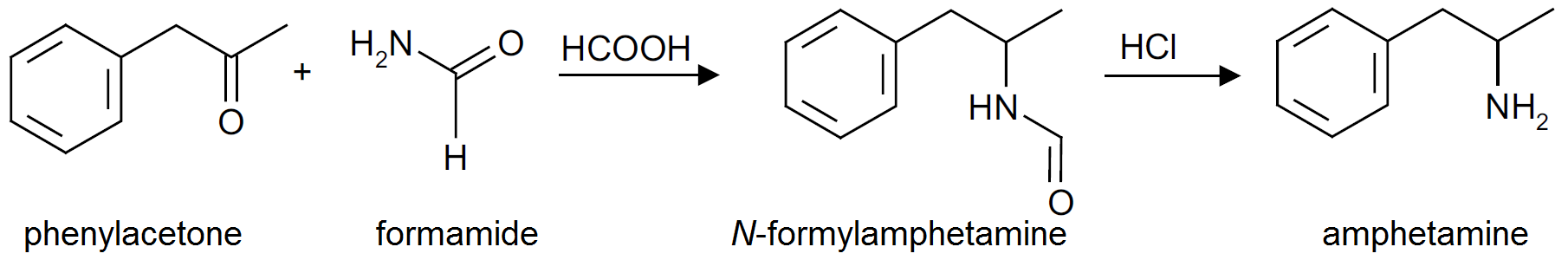
Synthesis of amphetamine via formetorex

Key chemical pathways for amphetamines

Amphetamines, are a class of compounds based upon the amphetamine structure.

- Phenylacetone, or P2P, It is a well-known precursor in the synthesis of amphetamine and methamphetamine
- Phenylacetic acid is used in the production of phenylacetone.
- Phenyl-2-nitropropene, or P2NP, it is a well-known precursor and intermediate in the synthesis of amphetamine.
- (2-Chloropropyl)benzene is used in the synthesis of amphetamine by Friedel–Crafts alkylation.
- Allylbenzene is a precursor in the synthesis of amphetamine via the Ritter synthesis.
- trans-Propenylbenzene is a precursor in the synthesis of P2P and β-hydroxyamphetamines.
- Benzaldehyde is a precursor in the synthesis of amphetamine via the Knoevenagel condensation method.
- Formetorex is used in the synthesis of amphetamine via the Leuckart reaction.
