= Metaglycodol =

Chemical compound

Clinical data
- ATC code: None

Identifiers
- IUPAC name: 2-(3-Chlorophenyl)-3-methyl-2,3-butanediol
- CAS Number: 13980-94-4
- PubChem CID: 26369
- ChemSpider: 24567
- UNII: F72B92ZZ08
- CompTox Dashboard (EPA): DTXSID70864459

Chemical and physical data
- Formula: C_{11}H_{15}ClO_{2}
- Molar mass: 214.69 g·mol^{−1}
- 3D model (JSmol): Interactive image
- SMILES: CC(C)(C(C)(c1cccc(c1)Cl)O)O
- InChI: InChI=1S/C11H15ClO2/c1-10(2,13)11(3,14)8-5-4-6-9(12)7-8/h4-7,13-14H,1-3H3; Key:OLXAYPPTCHXQRE-UHFFFAOYSA-N

Metaglycodol (INN) is a drug described as a tranquilizer which was never marketed.

== See also ==
- Phenaglycodol
- Fenpentadiol
