= Phenaglycodol =

Chemical compound

Clinical data
- ATC code: None

Legal status
- Legal status: BR: Class C1 (Other controlled substances)

Identifiers
- IUPAC name: 2-(4-chlorophenyl)-3-methyl-2,3-butanediol
- CAS Number: 79-93-6
- PubChem CID: 6617
- ChemSpider: 6365
- UNII: LMQ31KU50K
- CompTox Dashboard (EPA): DTXSID6023444
- ECHA InfoCard: 100.001.124

Chemical and physical data
- Formula: C_{11}H_{15}ClO_{2}
- Molar mass: 214.69 g·mol^{−1}
- 3D model (JSmol): Interactive image
- SMILES: CC(C)(C(C)(c1ccc(cc1)Cl)O)O
- InChI: InChI=1S/C11H15ClO2/c1-10(2,13)11(3,14)8-4-6-9(12)7-5-8/h4-7,13-14H,1-3H3; Key:HTYIXCKSEQQCJO-UHFFFAOYSA-N

Phenaglycodol (brand names Acalmid, Acalo, Alterton, Atadiol, Felixyn, Neotran, Pausital, Remin, Sedapsin, Sinforil, Stesil, Ultran) is a drug described as a tranquilizer or sedative which has anxiolytic and anticonvulsant properties. It is related pharmacologically to meprobamate, though it is not a carbamate.

== Synthesis ==
p-Chloroacetophenone and potassium cyanide (KCN) are reacted together via a Strecker reaction to give the corresponding cyanohydrin (3). The cyano group is then hydrated in acid to the corresponding amide, p-chloroatrolactamide (4). The amide group is then further hydrolyzed with a second equivalent of water in concentrated lye to give p-chloroatrolactic acid (5). Esterification then provides ethyl p-chloroatrolactate (6). Finally, nucleophilic addition with methylmagnesium iodide give phenaglycodol (7) crystals.

In a second method, a mixed pinacol coupling reaction between para-chloroacetophenone and acetone that was catalyzed by magnesium activated with a small amount of trimethylsilyl chloride gave a 40% yield of phenglycodol.

One-step method

== See also ==
- Metaglycodol
- Fenpentadiol
