= Streptomyces pulveraceus =

Scientific classification
- Domain: Bacteria
- Kingdom: Bacillati
- Phylum: Actinomycetota
- Class: Actinomycetes
- Order: Streptomycetales
- Family: Streptomycetaceae
- Genus: Streptomyces
- Species: S. pulveraceus

Binomial name
- Streptomyces pulveraceus Shibata et al. 1961

Type strain
- 45449, AS 4.1928, ATCC 13875, CGMCC 4.1928, DSM 41657, IFO 3855, JCM 7545, KCCM 12373, KCTC 9766, LMG 20322, NBRC 3855

Species of bacterium

Streptomyces pulveraceus is a bacterium species from the genus of Streptomyces which has been isolated from soil in Fukuchiyama in Japan. Streptomyces pulveraceus produces zygomycine and fostriecin.

== See also ==
- List of Streptomyces species
