= Fostedil =

Chemical compound

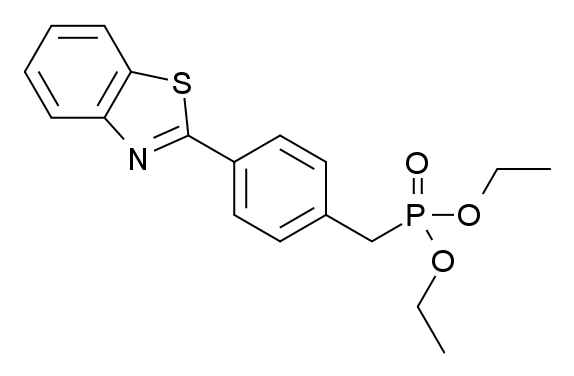

Clinical data
- Routes of administration: Oral
- ATC code: none

Legal status
- Legal status: In general: uncontrolled

Identifiers
- IUPAC name: diethyl [4-(1,3-benzothiazol-2-yl)benzyl]phosphonate
- CAS Number: 75889-62-2
- PubChem CID: 53421
- ChemSpider: 48253
- UNII: D41WS786UL
- KEGG: D04260
- ChEMBL: ChEMBL39516
- CompTox Dashboard (EPA): DTXSID70226811

Chemical and physical data
- Formula: C_{18}NO_{3}PS
- Molar mass: 341.24 g·mol^{−1}
- 3D model (JSmol): Interactive image
- SMILES: O=P(OCC)(OCC)Cc3ccc(c1nc2ccccc2s1)cc3

Fostedil (A-53,986, KB-944) is a vasodilator acting as a calcium channel blocker which was under development for the treatment of heart conditions such as angina pectoris but was never marketed. It has antihypertensive and antiarrhythmic effects.

== Synthesis ==
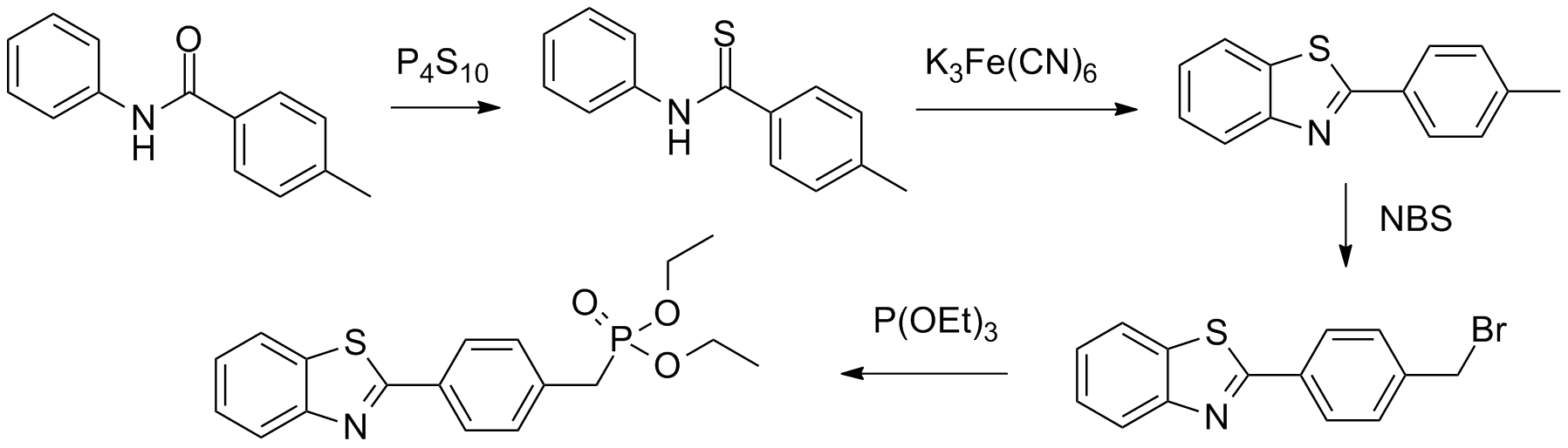
Fostedil synthesis:

1. Treatment of benzanilide with phosphorus pentasulfide or Lawesson's reagent gives thioamide.
2. Oxidative ring formation by reaction with potassium ferricyanide and base (presumably involving a free radical intermediate) constructs the benzothiazole ring.
3. Bromination of this compound with N-bromosuccinimide produces bromomethyl intermediate.
4. The synthesis of fostedil concludes with a Michaelis-Arbuzov reaction with triethyl phosphite.

== See also ==
- Ibrolipim
- Calcium channel blocker
