= Phoslactomycin B =

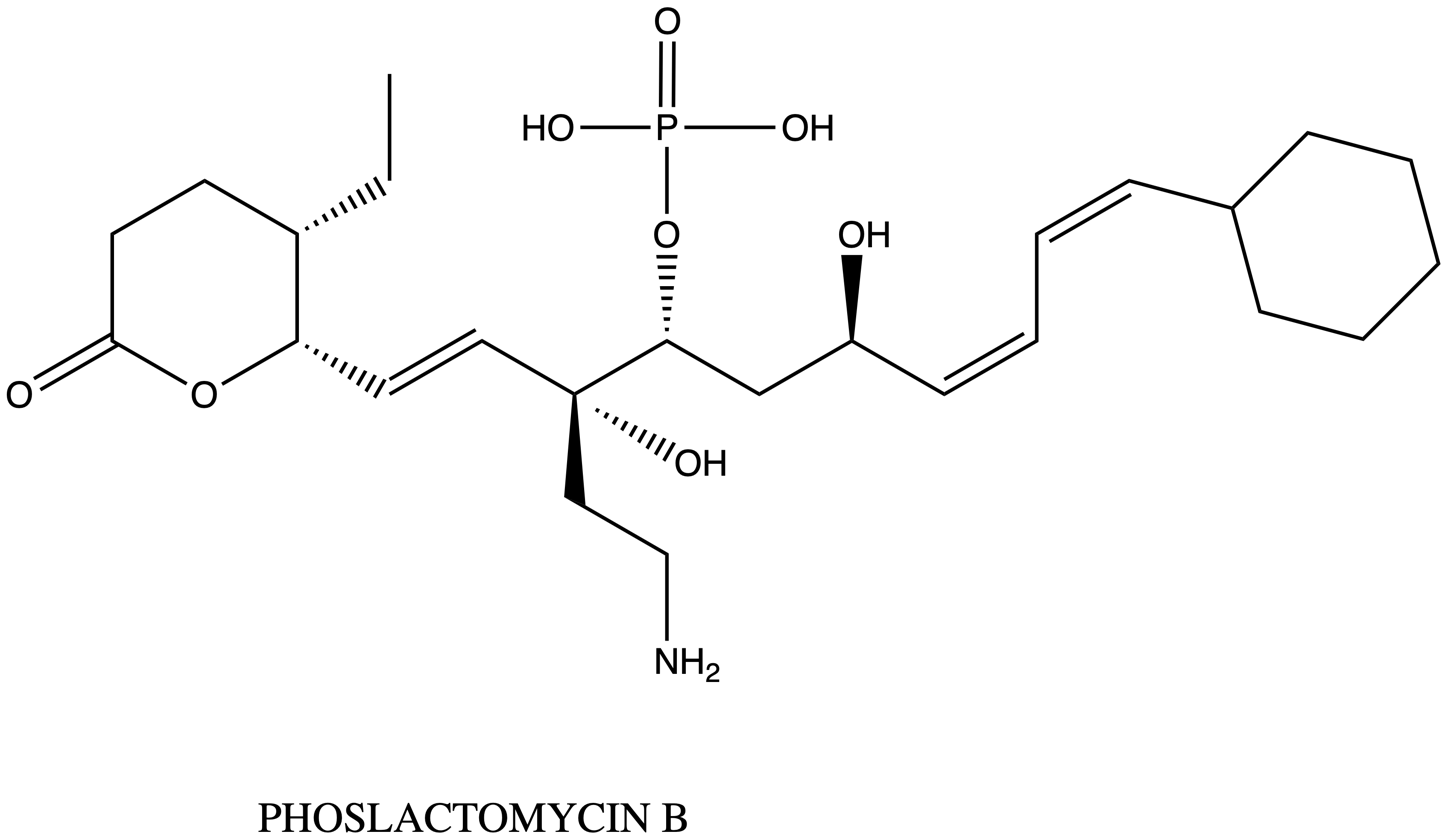

Names
- Preferred IUPAC name (1E,3R,4R,6R,7Z,9Z)-3-(2-Aminoethyl)-10-cyclohexyl-1-[(2S,3S)-3-ethyl-6-oxo-3,6-dihydro-2H-pyran-2-yl]-3,6-dihydroxydeca-1,7,9-trien-4-yl dihydrogen phosphate
- Other names 2H-Pyran-2-one, 6-(3-(2-aminoethyl)-10-cyclohexyl-3,6-dihydroxy-4-(phosphonooxy)-1,7,9-decatrienyl)-5-ethyl-5,6-dihydro-

Identifiers
CAS Number	122856-26-2
3D model (JSmol)	Interactive image
ChEBI	CHEBI:80042
ChemSpider	9671990
KEGG	C15710
PubChem CID	11497184
CompTox Dashboard (EPA)	DTXSID401100396
- InChI: InChI=1S/C25H40NO8P/c1-2-20-12-13-24(28)33-22(20)14-15-25(29,16-17-26)23(34-35(30,31)32)18-21(27)11-7-6-10-19-8-4-3-5-9-19/h6-7,10-15,19-23,27,29H,2-5,8-9,16-18,26H2,1H3,(H2,30,31,32)/b10-6-,11-7-,15-14+/t20-,21-,22-,23+,25-/m0/s1 Key: GAIPQMSJLNWRGC-MZAVDHTQSA-N
- SMILES: CC[C@H]1C=CC(=O)O[C@H]1/C=C/[C@](CCN)([C@@H](C[C@H](/C=C\C=C/C2CCCCC2)O)OP(=O)(O)O)O

Properties
Chemical formula	C_{25}H_{40}NO_{8}P
Molar mass	513.568 g·mol^{−1}
Density	1.3
- Except where otherwise noted, data are given for materials in their standard state (at 25 °C [77 °F], 100 kPa). Infobox references

Phoslactomycin (PLM) is a natural product from the isolation of Streptomyces species. This is an inhibitor of the protein serine/threonine phosphatase which is the protein phosphate 2A (PP2A). The PP2A involves the growth factor of the cell such as to induce the formation of mitogen-activated protein interaction and playing a role in cell division and signal transduction. Therefore, PLM is used for the drug that prevents the tumor, cancer, or bacteria. There are nowsaday has 7 kinds of different PLM from PLM A to PLM G which differ the post-synthesis from the biosynthesis of PLM.

Phoslactomycin B (PLM B) is the product of the post synthase of the biosynthesis of phoslactomycin and the intermediate to produce the other PLMs. The biosynthesis of phoslactomycin belongs to type I polyketide synthase (PKS). A polyketide is are characterized by a macrocyclic lactone and is produced by bacteria and fungi. From the PLM B, there are many articles wrote about the synthesis of different PLM A through PLM G.

PHOSLACTOMYCIN B
Chemical and physical data
Formula	$\ce{C25H40NO8P}$
Vapour pressure	0.0±5.7 mmHg at 25 °C
Polarizability	54.3±0.5 10^{−24}cm^{3}
Biology Organism
Kingdom	Bacteria
Family	Streptomycetaceae
Identify Information
Classification	OXIDOREDUCTASE
RDF Unique Identifier	C060449
KNApSAcK CID	C00017683
ChemBL	PMID 23790488
Research PubMed	PMC3875705

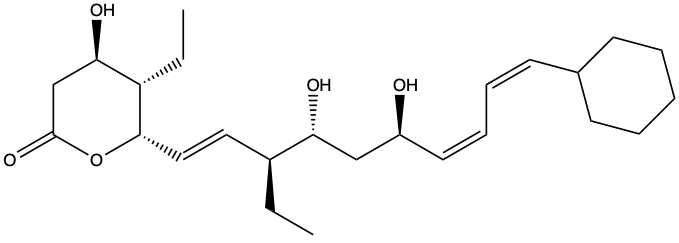
Phoslactomycin

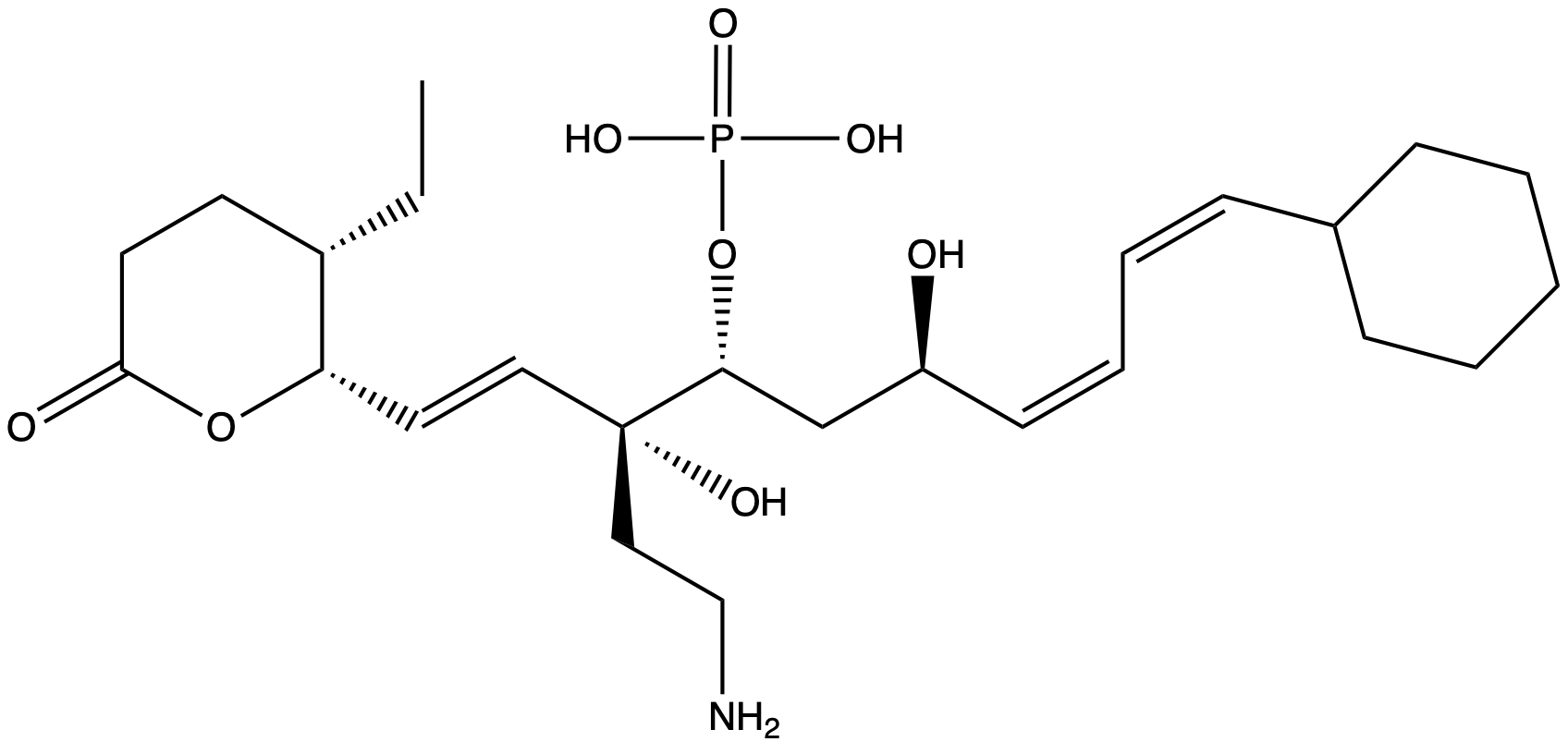
Phoslactomycin B1

== lyketide synthase domains ==
The domains in the polyketide synthase type I:

- ACP: acyl carrier protein (serves as chaperone)
- AT: acyl transferase (transfers acyl group form CoA to ACP)
- KS: keto synthase (forms the new carbon-carbon bond)
- KR: keto reductase (NADPH-dependent reduces beta-ketone to beta-hydroxyl)
- DH: dehydratase (eliminates beta-OH to anpha/beta-unsaturation)
- ER: enoyl reductase (NADPH-dependent reduces anpha/beta-unsaturation)
- TE: thioesterase (hydrolyses / cyclizes)

== Biosynthesis pathway of phoslactomycin ==
The PKS of phoslactomycin has one loading domain, 7 modules and 6 proteins that encode PnA, PnB, PnC, PnD, PnE, and PnF. The biosynthesis starts the loading with the cyclohexyl- CoA. Stepping in each module, there always need the keto synthase (KS) to create the new linkage of carbon-carbon to elongate the chain, the acyl transferase to transfer acyl to ACP domain. Then ACP serves as the acyl carrier protein to the further reaction, and each module has the keto reductase at the end to reduce the ketone to hydroxyl group with more stable. Module 1 uses the precursor malonyl-CoA and dehydrase domain to create the double bond.

Similarly, module 2, module 5, and module 7 have the same 5 domains KS-AT-ACP-DH-KR, but module 7 has one more domain at the end is thioesterase (TE) to create the ring member of the phoslactomycin product. Module 4 and module 6 have 4 domains which are KS-AT-ACP-KR and use the precursor ethylmalonyl-CoA. The final product is phoslactomycin.

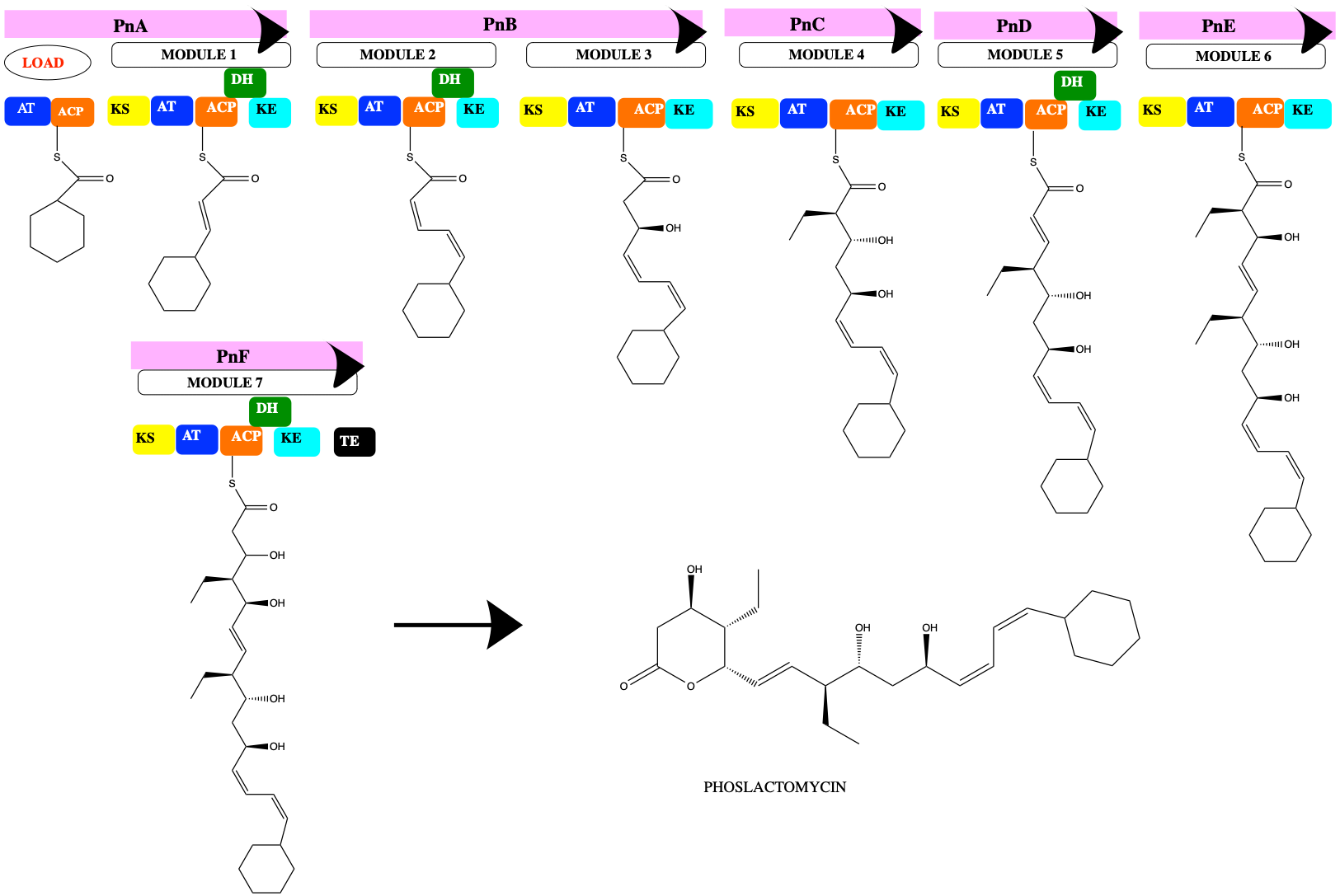
The biosynthesis of phoslactomycin. Type I polyketide pathway

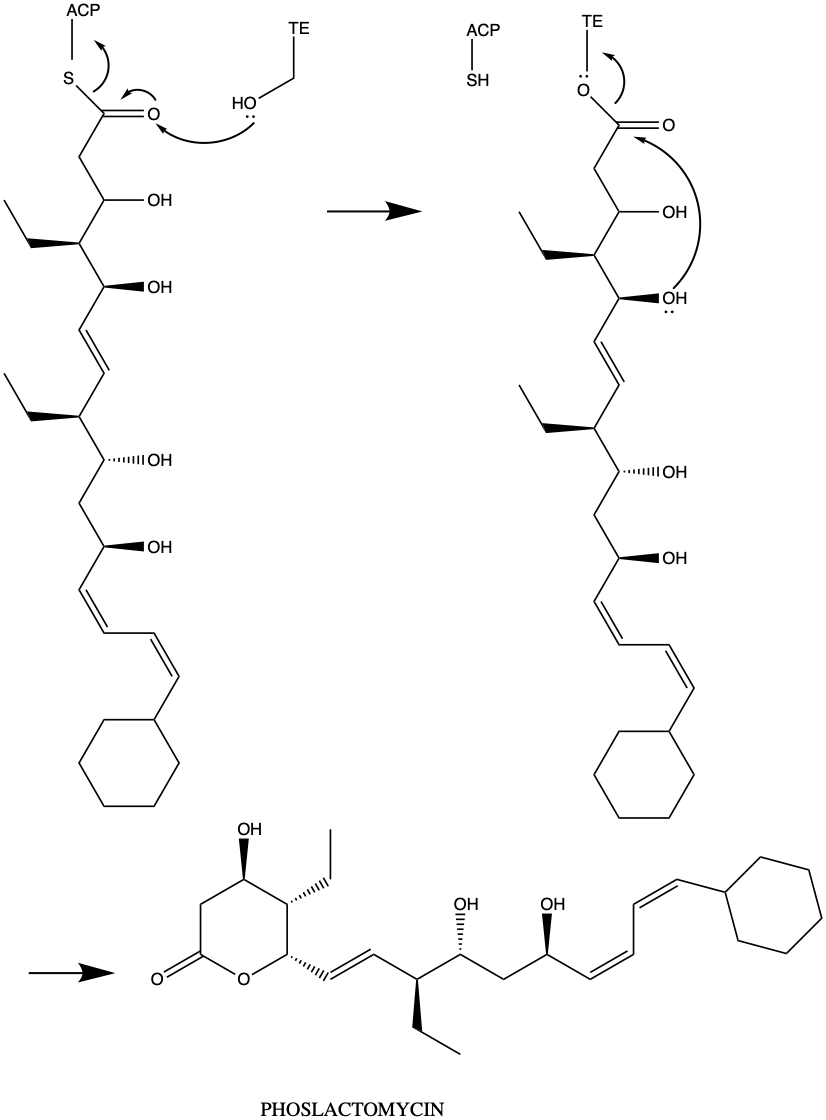
Cyclization to form phoslactomycin at TE domain

== Phoslactomycin family ==
Isolation from Streptomyces platensis, PLM is produces. Genes PnT1 and PnT2 regulate the post-synthesis of PLM to form PLM B by the phosphorylation and added the amine group . Figure 4 is based on the biosynthesis analysis on the Gene journal introduced that PLM B is used to produce PLM A, and 4 more PLMs C-F. The PLM A-F are the post synthesis product of the biosynthesis of PLM with the modification of many enzyme PnT1-T8.

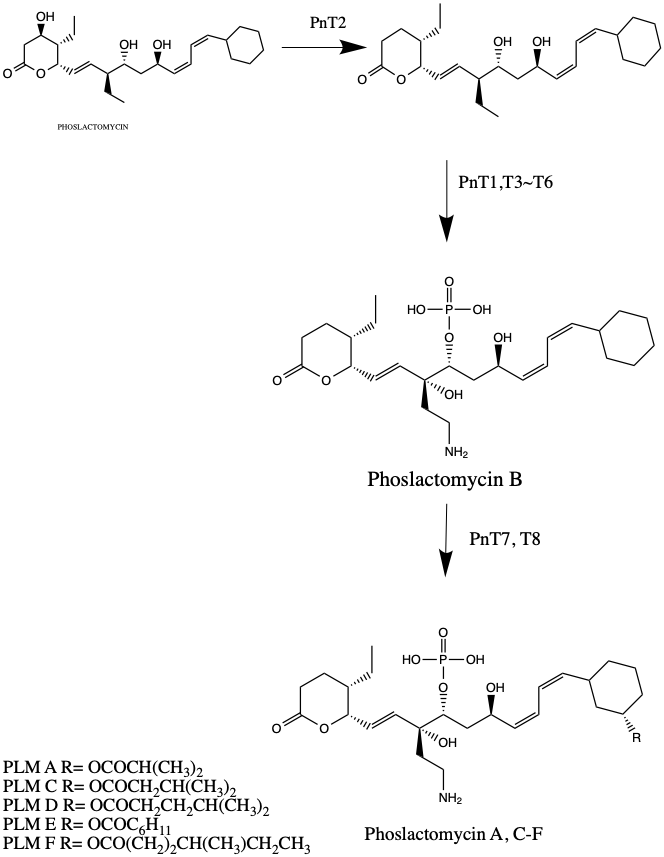
The post synthesis of PLM biosynthesis to form PLM B and the other PLMs

PLMs regulates the actin cytoskeleton as they induce actin depolymerization by the indirect way. In the experiment, PLM F does not affect to the polymerization of purified actin in vitro. However, PLM F enhances the phosphorylation of intracellular vimentin.
