= Microtrol =

Medical drug delivery system

Microtrol is an extended-release drug delivery system. It is used in certain medications like Adderall and incorporates two types of beads. The first dissolves immediately, releasing half of the medication, while the second type dissolves much more slowly releasing the remaining medication four hours later. Maximum plasma concentration is achieved in seven hours, compared to instant-release which reaches maximum concentration in three hours. Microtrol is manufactured by Supernus Pharmaceuticals, Inc.
