= Fosenazide =

Tranquilizer used in Russia for the treatment of alcohol withdrawal syndrom

Clinical data
- Other names: Gidifen, Fosfabenzid, Hydifen

Identifiers
- IUPAC name: 2-Diphenylphosphorylacetohydrazide
- CAS Number: 16543-10-5
- PubChem CID: 27918
- ChemSpider: 25972
- UNII: 16C19Z7F4I
- ChEMBL: ChEMBL1357989
- CompTox Dashboard (EPA): DTXSID1046188

Chemical and physical data
- Formula: C_{14}H_{15}N_{2}O_{2}P
- Molar mass: 274.260 g·mol^{−1}
- 3D model (JSmol): Interactive image
- SMILES: C1=CC=C(C=C1)P(=O)(CC(=O)NN)C2=CC=CC=C2
- InChI: InChI=1S/C14H15N2O2P/c15-16-14(17)11-19(18,12-7-3-1-4-8-12)13-9-5-2-6-10-13/h1-10H,11,15H2,(H,16,17); Key:PMHFLBQRALFMRT-UHFFFAOYSA-N

Fosenazid (Gidifen, Фозеназид) is a tranquilizer with notable central nicotinic-cholinolytic, antiadrenergic, and antiserotonin effects. Fosenazide is currently prescribed only in Russia, where it is used specifically for the treatment of alcohol withdrawal syndrome. Its unique chemical structure and pharmacological profile distinguish it from other neuroactive agents, with strong inhibitory activity against adrenaline and serotonin systems.

Fosenazide is an organophosphorus-containing medicine, and contains an acylhydrazine functional group.

== Pharmacology ==
Gidifen has a tranquilizing activity. The drug has an antihypertensive action and reduces tachycardia caused by the emotional stress. It has a selective anti-phobic and anti-aggressive ("serenic/ataractic/psycholeptic") action and does not produce ataxia.

It is patented for psychic and nervous disorders.

== Synthesis ==
The synthesis has been discussed: & in a USA patent: Precursor: Soviet patents: Swiss patent:

Diphenylphosphinic acid [1707-03-5] (1) is reacted with ethyl chloroacetate (2) in the presence of hexamethyldisilazane and trimethylchlorosilane to give Diphenylphosphinyl acetic acid ethyl ester i.e. ethyl (diphenylphosphoryl)acetate [6361-05-3] (3). Further reaction with hydrazine gives the required Fosenazide (4).

An entirely new synthesis pathway was identified in 2025.
