= Fermagate =

Inorganic phosphate binder developed for the control of blood plasma phosphate

Fermagate is a new inorganic phosphate binder developed for the control of blood plasma phosphate, a key therapeutic aim in the prevention of hyperphosphataemia in haemodialysis patients. It is currently under evaluation in clinical trials.

Fermagate is an iron magnesium hydroxy carbonate with the general formula, [Mg_{4}Fe_{2}(OH)_{12}].CO_{3} .4H_{2}O.

The structure comprises metal containing layers stacked with intercalating charge-balancing carbonate species and water molecules and belongs to a wider family of compounds also referred to as layered double hydroxides or hydrotalcites. The anions are held in this relatively insoluble structure in the spaces between the layers of metal ions and enables exchange of carbonate ions for free (inorganic) phosphate ions.

The compound is taken with a meal and the inorganic phosphate released through digestion can be readily bound to the Fermagate structure reducing the amount of bioavailable phosphate and thus helping to avoid high blood concentrations of inorganic phosphate. Studies indicate that materials with the Fermagate type of structure show relatively good selectivity for the negative phosphate ions in typical food matrices.
