= Fezakinumab =

Monoclonal antibody

Monoclonal antibody
- Type: Whole antibody
- Target: IL-22

Clinical data
- ATC code: none

Identifiers
- CAS Number: 1007106-86-6
- ChemSpider: none
- UNII: 0S77U25XZ3
- KEGG: D09615

Chemical and physical data
- Formula: C_{6408}H_{9873}N_{1706}O_{2016}S_{44}
- Molar mass: 144479.04 g·mol^{−1}

Fezakinumab is a human monoclonal antibody against interleukin-22, designed for the treatment of psoriasis and rheumatoid arthritis.

== Research and development ==
Wyeth discovered and initially developed the drug, and clinical development continued after that company was acquired by Pfizer. Fezakinumab, in combination with methotrexate, completed a phase II trial in rheumatoid arthritis, but data were not released. A small phase II trial of fezakinumab showed significant improvement in the Scoring Atopic Dermatitis (SCORAD) score for patients with severe atopic dermatitis.
