= Falecalcitriol =

Chemical compound

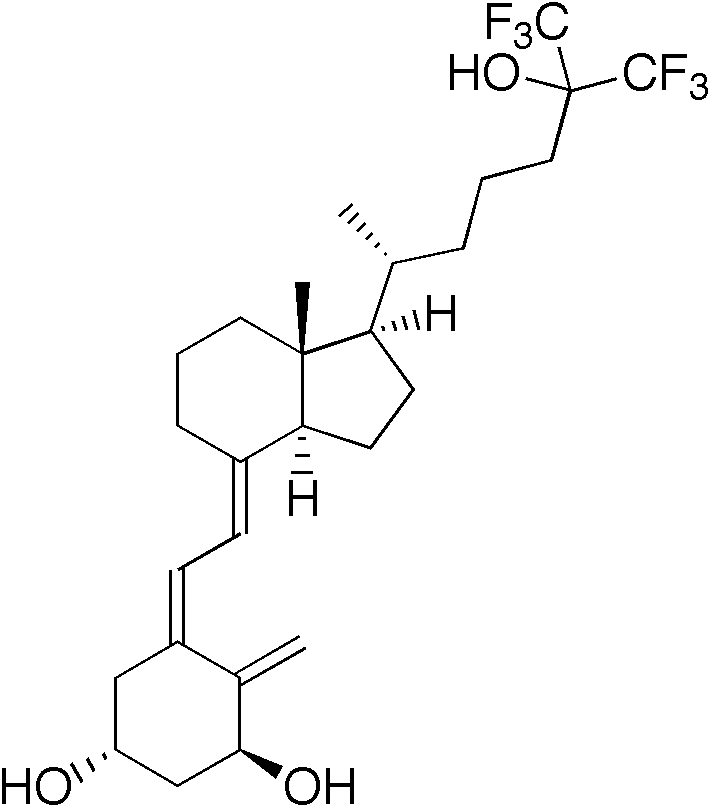

Clinical data
- Other names: 26,27-F₆-1α,25(OH)₂D₃
- AHFS/Drugs.com: International Drug Names
- Routes of administration: Oral
- ATC code: none

Legal status
- Legal status: In general: ℞ (Prescription only)

Identifiers
- IUPAC name: (1R,3S,5Z)-5-[(2E)-2-[(1R,3aS,7aR)-7a-Methyl-1-[(2R)-7,7,7-trifluoro-6-hydroxy-6-(trifluoromethyl)heptan-2-yl]-2,3,3a,5,6,7-hexahydro-1H-inden-4-ylidene]ethylidene]-4-methylidenecyclohexane-1,3-diol
- CAS Number: 83805-11-2
- PubChem CID: 5282190
- IUPHAR/BPS: 2781
- ChemSpider: 4445383
- UNII: G70A8514T8
- KEGG: D01662
- ChEMBL: ChEMBL2106158
- CompTox Dashboard (EPA): DTXSID601027560

Chemical and physical data
- Formula: C_{27}H_{38}F_{6}O_{3}
- Molar mass: 524.588 g·mol^{−1}
- 3D model (JSmol): Interactive image
- SMILES: C[C@H](CCCC(C(F)(F)F)(C(F)(F)F)O)[C@H]1CC[C@@H]\2[C@@]1(CCC/C2=C\C=C/3\C[C@H](C[C@@H](C3=C)O)O)C
- InChI: InChI=1S/C27H38F6O3/c1-16(6-4-13-25(36,26(28,29)30)27(31,32)33)21-10-11-22-18(7-5-12-24(21,22)3)8-9-19-14-20(34)15-23(35)17(19)2/h8-9,16,20-23,34-36H,2,4-7,10-15H2,1,3H3/b18-8+,19-9-/t16-,20-,21-,22+,23+,24-/m1/s1; Key:XPYGGHVSFMUHLH-UUSULHAXSA-N

Falecalcitriol (INN) is an analog of calcitriol. It has a higher potency both in vivo and in vitro systems, and longer duration of action in vivo.

Series	Provitamin	Vitamin	25(OH)	1,25(OH)_{2}
D_{3}	7-Dehydrocholesterol^{§}	Cholecalciferol^{ƒ#}	Calcifediol	Calcitriol^{#}
D_{2}	Ergosterol^{§}	Ergocalciferol^{ƒ#}	Ercalcidiol^{§}	Ercalcitriol^{§}
