= Florquinitau (18F) =

Chemical compound

Florquinitau (^{18}F)

Clinical data
- Trade names: Tauklarify
- Other names: MK-6240, florquinitau F18 (USAN US)
- AHFS/Drugs.com: Tauklarify
- License data: US DailyMed: Florquinitau
- Routes of administration: Intravenous
- Drug class: PET radiotracer
- ATC code: None

Legal status
- Legal status: US: ℞-only

Identifiers
- IUPAC name: 6-(^{18}F)fluoro-3-pyrrolo[2,3-c]pyridin-1-ylisoquinolin-5-amine
- CAS Number: 1841444-25-4
- PubChem CID: 121488182
- DrugBank: DB19215
- ChemSpider: 57405156
- UNII: E8VRR6FE0Y
- KEGG: D12194
- ChEBI: CHEBI:758559
- ChEMBL: ChEMBL4802252

Chemical and physical data
- Formula: C_{16}H_{11}^{18}FN_{4}
- 3D model (JSmol): Interactive image
- SMILES: C1=CC(=C(C2=CC(=NC=C21)N3C=CC4=C3C=NC=C4)N)F
- InChI: InChI=1S/C16H11FN4/c17-13-2-1-11-8-20-15(7-12(11)16(13)18)21-6-4-10-3-5-19-9-14(10)21/h1-9H,18H2; Key:KAXAUWZJVWGFDO-UHFFFAOYSA-N

Florquinitau (^{18}F), sold under the brand name Tauklarify, is a radioactive diagnostic agent used for positron emission tomography (PET) imaging. It is given by intravenous injection.

The most common side effects were headaches, nausea, injection site reactions, dizziness, and abdominal discomfort/pain.

Florquinitau (^{18}F) was approved for medical use in the United States in August 2026.

== Medical uses ==
Florquinitau (^{18}F) is indicated for positron emission tomography (PET) of the brain in adults with cognitive impairment who are being evaluated for Alzheimer's disease to identify people with tau neurofibrillary tangle (NFT) pathology.

== Society and culture ==
=== Legal status ===
Florquinitau (^{18}F) was approved for medical use in the United States in August 2026.

=== Brand names ===
Florquinitau (^{18}F) is sold under the brand name Tauklarify.
