= Flurpiridaz (18F) =

Medication

Flurpiridaz (^{18}F)

Clinical data
- Trade names: Flyrcado
- Other names: NMB58, BMS-747158-02, flurpiridaz F-18, flurpiridaz F 18 (USAN US)
- AHFS/Drugs.com: Flyrcado
- License data: US DailyMed: Flurpiridaz
- Routes of administration: Intravenous
- ATC code: V09GX06 (WHO)

Legal status
- Legal status: US: ℞-only

Identifiers
- IUPAC name: 2-tert-butyl-4-chloro-5-({4-[(2- [18F]fluoroethoxy)methyl]phenyl}methoxy)pyridazin-3(2H)-one
- CAS Number: 863887-89-2
- PubChem CID: 11405965
- DrugBank: DB18773
- ChemSpider: 9580860
- UNII: TY3V24C029
- KEGG: D10009
- CompTox Dashboard (EPA): DTXSID00235517

Chemical and physical data
- Formula: C_{18}H_{22}Cl[^{18}F]N_{2}O_{3}
- Molar mass: 367.8
- 3D model (JSmol): Interactive image
- SMILES: CC(C)(C)N1N=CC(OCC2=CC=C(COCC[18F])C=C2)=C(Cl)C1=O
- InChI: InChI=1S/C18H22ClFN2O3/c1-18(2,3)22-17(23)16(19)15(10-21-22)25-12-14-6-4-13(5-7-14)11-24-9-8-20/h4-7,10H,8-9,11-12H2,1-3H3/i20-1; Key:RMXZKEPDYBTFOS-LRFGSCOBSA-N

Flurpiridaz (^{18}F), sold under the brand name Flyrcado, is a cyclotron-produced radioactive diagnostic agent for use with positron emission tomography (PET) myocardial perfusion imaging under rest or stress (pharmacologic or exercise). Flurpiridaz (^{18}F) It is given by intravenous injection.

The most common adverse reactions include dyspnea (shortness of breath), headache, angina pectoris (severe pain in the chest), chest pain, fatigue, ST segment changes, flushing, nausea, abdominal pain, dizziness, and arrhythmia (irregular heartbeat).

Flurpiridaz (^{18}F) was approved for medical use in the United States in September 2024.

== Medical uses ==
Flurpiridaz (^{18}F) is indicated for positron emission tomography myocardial perfusion imaging, under rest or stress (pharmacologic or exercise), in adults with known or suspected coronary artery disease, to evaluate for myocardial ischemia and infarction.

== Adverse effects ==
Before administering, exercise and stress testing with adenosine should be performed, since elevated values might cause following side effects:

- dyspnea
- headache
- angina pectoris and chest pain
- fatigue
- myocardial infarction, including ST segment changes
- flushing
- nausea and vomiting
- back and abdominal pain
- dizziness
- diarrhea
- back pain
- rash
- dysgeusia
- cough
- pruritus
- dry mouth
- syncope
- arrhythmia
- hypotension
- bronchoconstriction
- stroke
- seizures

== Pharmacology ==
=== Mechanism of action ===
Flurpiridaz's structure can be divided into two parts:

- pyridaben – a NADH:ubiquinone oxidoreductase mitochondrial complex 1 (MC-1) inhibitor
- fluorine-18, bound to the ethoxy moiety, that binds to biologically active mitochondria in the myocardium

The radioactive signal is proportional to the blood flow; therefore, healthy tissue is more radioactive than infarcted one. It is partially selective towards the left ventricle over the right ventricle. Moreover, mitochondrial uptake of the drug is dependent on mitochondrial membrane potential, which explains its mechanism of action.

=== Pharmacokinetics ===
Flurpiridaz (^{18}F) has peak blood radioactivity at 2.3 minutes after administration, followed by a rise and plateau. Distribution of this radiopharmaceutical is complex, as it transfuses into the liver (13%), kidneys (9%), brain (8%) and epicardium (3%, radioactivity retains for 1 hour after administration). Full clearance is achieved within 48 hours. Only metabolites of flurpiridaz are excreted, mainly in urine and feces. Flurpiridaz metabolises into many different polar metabolites.

There are no differences in pharmacokinetics caused by age, sex, body mass index (BMI), diabetic status, Clid Pugh A hepatic impairment and renal impairment at eGFR≥19-89 mL/min.

== Chemistry ==
=== Radiation characteristics ===
Flurpiridaz (^{18}F) has a halflife of 109.8 minutes and the main photons useful for imaging are those resulting from gamma decay through interaction of the positron with an electron.

Fluorine-18 emission characteristics
Radioactive emission type	% of disintegration	Mean energy of decay (keV)
positron (β^{+})	96.7	249.8
gamma	193.5	511

Fluorine-18's decay characteristics were determined to be:

Decay characteristics of fluorine-18
Parameter	Value
air-kerma rate constant	3.74·10^{−17} Gy·m^{2}/(Bq·s)
specific gamma-ray constant	5.7 R/(hr·mCi) at 1 cm
first half-value thickness of lead	6 mm

Effective dose at rest and adenosine-induced pharmacologic stress is equal to 0.019 mSv/MBq,; under exercise-induced stress, it is equal to 0.016 mSv/MBq. Whole-body effective dose is described as follows:

Whole-body radiation dose
Condition	Maximal activity (MBq)	Effective dose (mSv)	Absorbed dose (mGy) in epicardium
Rest	111	2.1	5.3
Pharmacological stress	241	4.6	22
Exercise stress	325	5.3	14

=== Synthesis ===
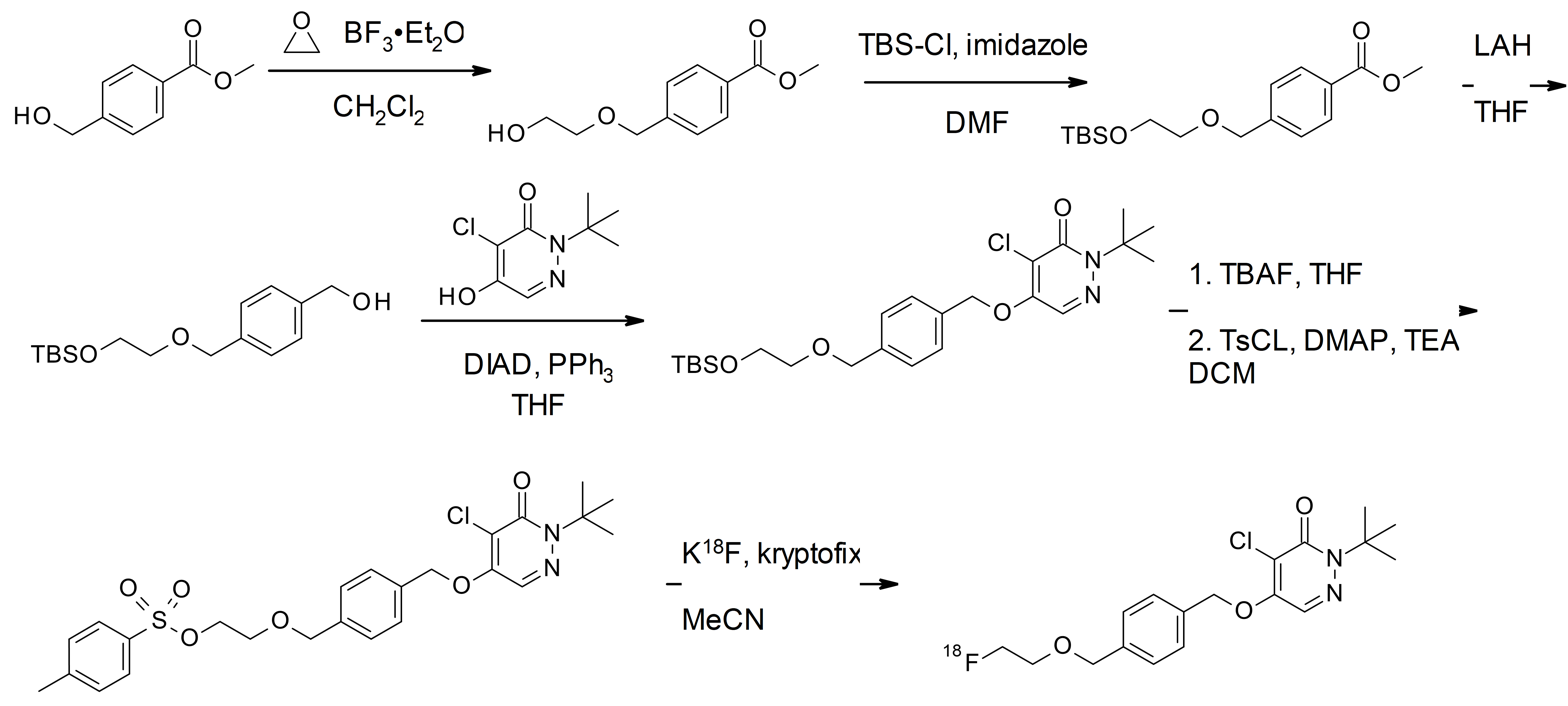
Flupiridaz (18F) synthesis

Methyl p-(hydroxymethyl)benzoate undergoes reaction with ethylene oxide with boron trifluoride etherate and dichloromethane to yield 2-hydroxyethyl ether. Then, the hydroxy group is substituted with tert-butyldimethylsilyl chloride (TMS-Cl) in dimethylformamide (DMF). Next, the ester is reduced into an according alcohol using lithium aluminium hydride (LAH) in tetrahydrofuran. The newly created hydroxy moiety undergoes addition with 2-tert-butyl-4-chloro-5-hydroxy-pyridazin-3-one. The TBSO group is then substituted with a tosyl group with a two-step reaction using (1) tetra-n-butylammonium fluoride (TBAF) in THF and (2) tosyl chloride in 4-dimethylaminopyridine (DMAP), triethylamine (TEA) and dichloromethane. To create the final radiolabelled radiopharmaceutical, potassium fluoride-18 is used. This step is performed using kryptofix, a phase-transfer catalyst, and acetonitrile. Kryptofix (5-decyl-4,7,13,16,21-pentaoxa-1,10-diazabicyclo[8.8.5]tricosane), a cryptand, increases the solubility of the fluoride ion in organic solvents (here, acetonitrile), by chelating it.

== History ==
Flurpiridaz F-18 is a fluorine 18-labeled agent, developed by Lantheus Medical Imaging for the diagnosis of coronary artery disease.

The efficacy and safety of flurpiridaz (^{18}F) was evaluated in two prospective, multicenter, open-label clinical studies in adults with either suspected CAD (Study 1: NCT03354273) or known or suspected CAD (Study 2: NCT01347710). Study 1 evaluated the sensitivity (ability to designate an imaged patient with disease as positive) and specificity (ability to designate an imaged patient without disease as negative) of flurpiridaz (^{18}F) for the detection of significant CAD in subjects with suspected CAD, who were scheduled for invasive coronary angiography (ICA). Across three flurpiridaz (^{18}F) imaging readers, estimates of sensitivity ranged from 74% to 89% and estimates of specificity ranged from 53% to 70% for CAD defined as at least 50% narrowing of an artery.

Study 2 evaluated the sensitivity and specificity of flurpiridaz (^{18}F) for the detection of significant CAD in subjects with known or suspected CAD, who had ICA without intervention within 60 days prior to imaging or were scheduled for ICA. Across three flurpiridaz (^{18}F) imaging readers, estimates of sensitivity ranged from 63% to 77% and estimates of specificity ranged from 66% to 86% for CAD defined as at least 50% narrowing of an artery.

== Society and culture ==
=== Legal status ===
Flurpiridaz (^{18}F) was approved for medical use in the United States in September 2024. In the European Union, it is, as of 2026, undergoing a phase three clinical trial.

=== Names ===
Flurpiridaz (^{18}F) is the international nonproprietary name.
