= Fantofarone =

Names
- Preferred IUPAC name N-[2-(3,4-Dimethoxyphenyl)ethyl]-N-methyl-3-{4-[2-(propan-2-yl)indolizine-1-sulfonyl]phenoxy}propan-1-amine

Identifiers
CAS Number	114432-13-2
3D model (JSmol)	Interactive image
ChEMBL	ChEMBL285855
ChemSpider	106600
PubChem CID	119349
UNII	KU213XYO69
CompTox Dashboard (EPA)	DTXSID30150729
- InChI: InChI=1S/C31H38N2O5S/c1-23(2)27-22-33-18-7-6-9-28(33)31(27)39(34,35)26-13-11-25(12-14-26)38-20-8-17-32(3)19-16-24-10-15-29(36-4)30(21-24)37-5/h6-7,9-15,18,21-23H,8,16-17,19-20H2,1-5H3 Key: ITAMRBIZWGDOHW-UHFFFAOYSA-N; InChI=1/C31H38N2O5S/c1-23(2)27-22-33-18-7-6-9-28(33)31(27)39(34,35)26-13-11-25(12-14-26)38-20-8-17-32(3)19-16-24-10-15-29(36-4)30(21-24)37-5/h6-7,9-15,18,21-23H,8,16-17,19-20H2,1-5H3 Key: ITAMRBIZWGDOHW-UHFFFAOYAL
- SMILES: CC(C)C1=CN2C=CC=CC2=C1S(=O)(=O)C3=CC=C(C=C3)OCCCN(C)CCC4=CC(=C(C=C4)OC)OC

Properties
Chemical formula	C_{31}H_{38}N_{2}O_{5}S
Molar mass	550.71 g·mol^{−1}
- Except where otherwise noted, data are given for materials in their standard state (at 25 °C [77 °F], 100 kPa). verify (what is ?) Infobox references

Fantofarone is a calcium channel blocker.

== Comparison with verapamil ==
There are many different calcium channel blockers that show different results in use. Fantofarone and verapamil are both calcium channel blockers that behave differently in different applications.

Fantofarone was shown in use for treatment of angioplasty-induced vasospasm in an atherosclerotic rabbits. There are many different observations that show a potential cause of vasospasm, such as local injury on the body, but overall mechanism of it is still not fully understood. In order to observe the efficiency of fantofarone in the treatment of angioplasty-induced vasospasm (AIV), it was compared to the treatment of verapamil (which is also a calcium channel blocker). Fantofarone showed more effectiveness against a severity of vasospasm than verapamil.

Fantofarone and verapamil were also tested as an attempt of reversing resistance to chloroquine, a medication that is used to treat malaria. In the treatment of reversing the chloroquine resistance it was observed that verapamil was more potent and more efficient than fantofarone.
