= Fenleuton =

5-lipoxygenase inhibitor

Clinical data
- Trade names: Lofrin
- ATC code: none

Identifiers
- IUPAC name: 1-{4-[3-(4-Fluorophenoxy)phenyl]-3-butyn-2-yl}-1-hydroxyurea
- CAS Number: 141579-54-6
- ChemSpider: 65045
- UNII: LG64454O6I
- KEGG: D04151
- CompTox Dashboard (EPA): DTXSID40869916

Chemical and physical data
- Formula: C_{17}H_{15}FN_{2}O_{3}
- Molar mass: 314.316 g·mol^{−1}
- 3D model (JSmol): Interactive image
- SMILES: CC(C#Cc1cccc(c1)Oc2ccc(cc2)F)N(C(=O)N)O
- InChI: InChI=InChI=1S/C17H15FN2O3/c1-12(20(22)17(19)21)5-6-13-3-2-4-16(11-13)23-15-9-7-14(18)8-10-15/h2-4,7-12,22H,1H3,(H2,19,21); Key:MWXPQCKCKPYBDR-UHFFFAOYSA-N

Fenleuton (trade name Lofrin) is a drug that acts as a 5-lipoxygenase inhibitor and inhibits leukotriene (LTB4, LTC4, LTD4, and LTE4) formation. It has been studied for potential use in veterinary medicine to treat respiratory diseases such as chronic obstructive pulmonary disease (COPD) in horses.
