= Faralimomab =

Monoclonal antibody

Monoclonal antibody
- Type: Whole antibody
- Source: Mouse
- Target: Interferon receptor

Clinical data
- ATC code: none

Identifiers
- CAS Number: 167816-91-3
- ChemSpider: none
- UNII: 8MK3PL8DNZ

Faralimomab is a mouse monoclonal antibody and an immunomodulator.
