= Forasartan =

Chemical compound

Clinical data
- Other names: SC-52458
- Pregnancy category: Not assigned
- Routes of administration: Oral
- ATC code: C09CA (WHO)

Legal status
- Legal status: Development halted, never marketed

Pharmacokinetic data
- Elimination half-life: 1–2 hours

Identifiers
- IUPAC name: 5-[(3,5-Dibutyl-1H-1,2,4-triazol-1-yl)methyl]-2-[2-(2H-tetrazol-5-yl)phenyl]pyridine
- CAS Number: 145216-43-9
- PubChem CID: 132706
- DrugBank: DB01342
- ChemSpider: 117146
- UNII: 065F7WPT0B
- KEGG: D04243
- ChEBI: CHEBI:141552
- ChEMBL: ChEMBL315021
- CompTox Dashboard (EPA): DTXSID70162942

Chemical and physical data
- Formula: C_{23}H_{28}N_{8}
- Molar mass: 416.533 g·mol^{−1}
- 3D model (JSmol): Interactive image
- SMILES: CCCCC1=NN(C(=N1)CCCC)CC2=CN=C(C=C2)C3=CC=CC=C3C4=NNN=N4
- InChI: InChI=1S/C23H28N8/c1-3-5-11-21-25-22(12-6-4-2)31(28-21)16-17-13-14-20(24-15-17)18-9-7-8-10-19(18)23-26-29-30-27-23/h7-10,13-15H,3-6,11-12,16H2,1-2H3,(H,26,27,29,30); Key:YONOBYIBNBCDSJ-UHFFFAOYSA-N

Forasartan, otherwise known as the compound SC-52458, is a nonpeptide angiotensin II receptor antagonist (ARB, AT_{1} receptor blocker).

== Indications ==
Forasartan is indicated for the treatment of hypertension and, similar to other ARBs, it protects the kidneys from kidney blood vessel damage caused by increased kidney blood pressure by blocking renin–angiotensin system activation.

== Administration ==
Forasartan is administered in the active oral form which means that it must go through first pass metabolism in the liver. The dose administered ranges between 150 mg-200 mg daily. Increasing to more than 200 mg daily does not offer significantly greater AT_{1} receptor inhibition. Forasartan is absorbed quickly in the GI, and within an hour it becomes significantly biologically active. Peak plasma concentrations of the drug are reached within one hour.

== Contraindications ==
Negative side effects of Forasartan are similar to other ARBs, and include hypotension and hyperkalemia. There are no drug interactions identified with forasartan.

== Pharmacology ==
=== The angiotensin II receptor, type 1 ===
Angiotensin II binds to AT_{1} receptors, increases contraction of vascular smooth muscle, and stimulates aldosterone resulting in sodium reabsorption and increase in blood volume. Smooth muscle contraction occurs due to increased calcium influx through the L-type calcium channels in smooth muscle cells during the plateau component, increasing the intracellular calcium and membrane potential which sustain depolarization and contraction.

=== Effects ===
Forasartan is a competitive and reversible ARB that competes with the angiotensin II binding site on AT_{1} and relaxes vascular smooth muscle, resulting in decreased blood pressure. Forasartan has a high affinity for the AT_{1} receptor (IC50=2.9 +/- 0.1nM). In dogs, it was found to block the pressor response of Angiotensin II with maximal inhibition, 91%. Forasartan administration selectively inhibits L-type calcium channels in the plateau component of the smooth muscle cells, favoring relaxation of the smooth muscle. Forasartan also decreases heart rate by inhibiting the positive chronotropic effect of high frequency preganglionic stimuli.

== Scarce use ==
Even though experiments have been conducted on rabbits, guinea pigs, dogs and humans, forasartan is not a popular drug of choice for hypertension due to its short duration of action; forasartan is less effective than losartan. Research demonstrates that forasartan is also significantly less potent than losartan.

== See also ==
- Discovery and development of angiotensin receptor blockers
