= Flumizole =

NSAID anti-inflammatory compound

Clinical data
- ATC code: none

Identifiers
- IUPAC name: 4,5-bis(4-methoxyphenyl)-2-(trifluoromethyl)-1H-imidazole
- CAS Number: 36740-73-5
- PubChem CID: 37518
- ChemSpider: 34419
- UNII: Y4YQF944N9
- KEGG: D04211
- ChEMBL: ChEMBL430150
- CompTox Dashboard (EPA): DTXSID10190204

Chemical and physical data
- Formula: C_{18}H_{15}F_{3}N_{2}O_{2}
- Molar mass: 348.325 g·mol^{−1}
- 3D model (JSmol): Interactive image
- SMILES: FC(F)(F)c2[nH]c(c(c1ccc(OC)cc1)n2)c3ccc(OC)cc3
- InChI: InChI=1S/C18H15F3N2O2/c1-24-13-7-3-11(4-8-13)15-16(23-17(22-15)18(19,20)21)12-5-9-14(25-2)10-6-12/h3-10H,1-2H3,(H,22,23); Key:OPYFPDBMMYUPME-UHFFFAOYSA-N

Flumizole is an antiinflammatory agent. More specifically, it is a nonsteroidal anti-inflammatory drug (NSAID) that acts via inhibition of the enzyme cyclooxygenase (COX).
