= Fontolizumab =

Monoclonal antibody

Monoclonal antibody
- Type: Whole antibody
- Source: Humanized (from mouse)
- Target: interferon gamma

Clinical data
- ATC code: none

Identifiers
- CAS Number: 326859-36-3
- ChemSpider: none
- UNII: 6J92H2439Z
- KEGG: D04242

Chemical and physical data
- Molar mass: ca. 150 kg/mol

Fontolizumab (planned trade name HuZAF) is a humanized monoclonal antibody and an immunosuppressive drug for the treatment of auto-immune diseases like Crohn's disease. A phase II clinical trial investigating the use for rheumatoid arthritis was terminated because the first phase did not meet the endpoint.
