= Felvizumab =

Monoclonal antibody

Monoclonal antibody
- Type: Whole antibody
- Source: Humanized (from mouse)
- Target: RSV

Clinical data
- ATC code: none

Identifiers
- CAS Number: 167747-20-8
- ChemSpider: none
- UNII: W9ZA2K5Q83
- KEGG: D04136

Felvizumab is a humanized monoclonal antibody against respiratory syncytial virus.
