= Foravirumab =

Monoclonal antibody

Monoclonal antibody
- Type: Whole antibody
- Source: Human
- Target: rabies virus glycoprotein

Clinical data
- ATC code: none

Identifiers
- CAS Number: 944548-38-3
- ChemSpider: none
- UNII: 377VY97V7S
- ChEMBL: ChEMBL1743021

Chemical and physical data
- Formula: C_{6400}H_{9914}N_{1718}O_{1998}S_{44}
- Molar mass: 144304.38 g·mol^{−1}

Foravirumab is a monoclonal antibody for the prophylaxis of rabies. It is under development by Sanofi/Crucell.
