= Fastin =

Fastin is a dietary supplement that is manufactured and marketed for weight loss by Hi Tech Pharmaceuticals in Atlanta, GA. There is no clinical evidence that this supplement is effective for weight loss. Fastin was once a brand name of a drug called phentermine and the Fastin brand of phentermine was manufactured by King Pharmaceuticals.

Fastin and 10 other products manufactured by Hi Tech Pharmaceuticals were banned by the U.S. Food and Drug Administration (FDA) in 2013 because they contain Dimethylamylamine HCl (DMAA), an illegal food additive that is deemed unsafe. At the request of the FDA, U.S. Marshals seized dietary supplements worth more than $2 million manufactured and held by Hi-Tech Pharmaceuticals. Numerous reports of illnesses and death have been associated with supplements containing DMAA.

According to the company, it currently uses phenylethylamine as the active ingredient.
