= Hydrocodone/guaifenesin =

Medication

Combination of
- Hydrocodone: Opioid agonist
- Guaifenesin: Expectorant

Clinical data
- Trade names: Obredon, Flowtuss, others
- AHFS/Drugs.com: Consumer Drug Information; Consumer Drug Information
- License data: US DailyMed: Hydrocodone and guaifenesin
- Routes of administration: By mouth
- ATC code: R05FA02 (WHO)

Legal status
- Legal status: US: Schedule II

Identifiers
- CAS Number: 941568-01-0
- KEGG: D11087

Hydrocodone/guaifenesin, sold under the brand name Obredon among others, is a fixed-dose combination medication used for the treatment of cough. It contains hydrocodone, as the bitartrate, an opioid agonist; and guaifenesin, an expectorant. It is taken by mouth.

Hydrocodone/guaifenesin was approved for medical use in the United States in 2014.

== Adverse effects ==
In the US, the label for hydrocodone/guaifenesin contains a black box warning about addiction, abuse, and misuse.
