= Fruquintinib =

Medication

Clinical data
- Trade names: Fruzaqla
- Other names: HMPL-013
- AHFS/Drugs.com: Monograph
- MedlinePlus: a623060
- License data: US DailyMed: Fruquintinib
- Pregnancy category: AU: D
- Routes of administration: By mouth
- Drug class: Antineoplastic
- ATC code: L01EK04 (WHO)

Legal status
- Legal status: AU: S4 (Prescription only); CA: ℞-only; US: ℞-only; EU: Rx-only

Pharmacokinetic data
- Protein binding: Plasma protein binding of fruquintinib is approximately 95%.
- Metabolism: Fruquintinib is primarily eliminated by CYP450 and non-CYP450 (i.e., sulfation and glucuronidation) metabolism. CYP3A and to a lesser extent CYP2C8, CYP2C9, and CYP2C19 are the CYP450 enzymes involved in fruquintinib metabolism.
- Metabolites: The potency of M11 for inhibiting VEGFR-2 kinase activity is 10 times lower than that of fruquintinib (Takeda data on file); therefore, M11 is not considered an active metabolite.
- Elimination half-life: 42hr
- Excretion: A previous study reported that following administration of 5 mg of radiolabeled fruquintinib, approximately 60% of the dose was recovered in urine (0.50% unchanged) and 30% was recovered in feces (5.34% unchanged), with the remaining radioactivity excreted as metabolites.

Identifiers
- IUPAC name: 6-[(6,7-dimethoxyquinazolin-4-yl)oxy]-N,2-dimethyl-1-benzofuran-3-carboxamide
- CAS Number: 1194506-26-7
- PubChem CID: 44480399
- IUPHAR/BPS: 9428
- DrugBank: DB11679
- ChemSpider: 39625837
- UNII: 49DXG3M5ZW
- KEGG: D11977
- ChEBI: CHEBI:229221
- ChEMBL: ChEMBL4303214

Chemical and physical data
- Formula: C_{21}H_{19}N_{3}O_{5}
- Molar mass: 393.399 g·mol^{−1}
- 3D model (JSmol): Interactive image
- Solubility in water: The aqueous solubility of fruquintinib is pH-dependent, with a solubility of 0.9 μg/mL at pH 6.8 that increases under acidic conditions to 129.9 μg/mL at pH 1. Fruquintinib is soluble in organic solvents such as DMSO and dimethyl formamide (DMF). The solubility of fruquintinib in these solvents is approximately 2 and 5 mg/ml, respectively.
- SMILES: CNC(=O)C1=C(C)OC2=CC(OC3=NC=NC4=CC(OC)=C(OC)C=C34)=CC=C12
- InChI: InChI=1S/C21H19N3O5/c1-11-19(20(25)22-2)13-6-5-12(7-16(13)28-11)29-21-14-8-17(26-3)18(27-4)9-15(14)23-10-24-21/h5-10H,1-4H3,(H,22,25); Key:BALLNEJQLSTPIO-UHFFFAOYSA-N

Fruquintinib, sold under the brand name Fruzaqla, is an anti-cancer medication used for the treatment of colorectal cancer. Fruquintinib is a kinase inhibitor. It is taken by mouth.

The most common adverse reactions include hypertension, palmar-plantar erythrodysesthesia, proteinuria, dysphonia, abdominal pain, diarrhea, and asthenia.

Fruquintinib was approved for medical use in the United States in November 2023.

== Medical uses ==
Fruquintinib is indicated for adults with metastatic colorectal cancer who received prior fluoropyrimidine-, oxaliplatin-, and irinotecan-based chemotherapy, an anti-VEGF therapy, and, if RAS wild-type and medically appropriate, an anti-EGFR therapy.

== Pharmacology ==
The earlier generation small molecule VEGFR inhibitors, such as sunitinib, sorafenib, regorafenib and pazopanib suffer from poor kinome selectivity. In fact, many of them inhibit more than 10 kinases at similar potency.

Fruquintinib is a highly potent and selective VEGFR 1, 2, 3 inhibitor

Fruquintinib was found to inhibit VEGFR2 (KDR) with an IC_{50} of 25 nmol/L in the Z-lyte assay. The kinase selectivity of fruquintinib was evaluated against a panel of 253 kinases using [^{32}p-ATP] incorporation assay by Upstate Biotechnology Inc. (UBI) (Fig. 1B). The results showed that fruquintinib inhibited VEGFR family member (VEGFR1, 2, 3) with IC_{50}s of 33 nmol/L, 35 nmol/L and 0.5 nmol/L, respectively with weak inhibition of RET, FGFR-1 and c-kit kinases. No significant inhibition was found against all other kinases at 1 μmol/L

== History ==
Efficacy was evaluated in FRESCO-2 (NCT04322539) and FRESCO (NCT02314819). FRESCO-2 (NCT04322539), an international, multicenter, randomized, double-blind, placebo-controlled trial, evaluated 691 participants with metastatic colorectal cancer who had disease progression during or after prior fluoropyrimidine-, oxaliplatin-, irinotecan-based chemotherapy, an anti-VEGF biological therapy an anti-EGFR biological therapy if RAS wild type, and at least one of trifluridine/tipiracil or regorafenib. FRESCO, a multicenter, placebo-controlled trial conducted in China, evaluated 416 participants with metastatic colorectal cancer who had disease progression during or after prior fluoropyrimidine-, oxaliplatin, and irinotecan-based chemotherapy.

== Legal status ==
In April 2024, the Committee for Medicinal Products for Human Use (CHMP) of the European Medicines Agency adopted a positive opinion, recommending the granting of a marketing authorization for the medicinal product Fruzaqla, intended for the treatment of people with previously treated metastatic colorectal cancer (mCRC). The applicant for this medicinal product is Takeda Pharmaceuticals International AG Ireland Branch. Fruzaqla was approved for medical use in the United States in June 2024.

== Synthesis ==
The last step in the synthesis of is disclosed. In addition, a recent article outlining the synthesis of the precursor was also disclosed.

invert-skin-image

An SNAr reaction between 4-Chloro-6,7-dimethoxyquinazoline [13790-39-1] (1) and 6-hydroxy-N,2-dimethylbenzofuran-3-carboxamide [638217-08-0] (2) afforded fruquintinib in 85% yield.

N.B. It is interesting to take stock that precursor 1 finds dual use in the synthesis of Buquineran, Hoquizil & Piquizil.
