= Foscarbidopa =

Chemical compound

Identifiers
- IUPAC name: (2S)-2-hydrazinyl-3-(3-hydroxy-4-phosphonooxyphenyl)-2-methylpropanoic acid
- CAS Number: 1907685-81-7
- PubChem CID: 121288738
- DrugBank: DB16171
- ChemSpider: 64854094
- UNII: 5NT8HCA4OO
- KEGG: D12057; D11879
- ChEBI: CHEBI:192511
- ChEMBL: ChEMBL4802240

Chemical and physical data
- Formula: C_{10}H_{15}N_{2}O_{7}P
- Molar mass: 306.211 g·mol^{−1}
- 3D model (JSmol): Interactive image
- SMILES: C[C@](CC1=CC(=C(C=C1)OP(=O)(O)O)O)(C(=O)O)NN
- InChI: InChI=1S/C10H15N2O7P/c1-10(12-11,9(14)15)5-6-2-3-8(7(13)4-6)19-20(16,17)18/h2-4,12-13H,5,11H2,1H3,(H,14,15)(H2,16,17,18)/t10-/m0/s1; Key:PQUZXFMHVSMUNG-JTQLQIEISA-N

Foscarbidopa is a medication which acts as a prodrug for carbidopa. It is used in a subcutaneous infusion as a fixed-dose combination with foslevodopa for the treatment of Parkinson's disease, under the brand name Vyalev.
