= Ibrolipim =

Names
- Preferred IUPAC name Diethyl ({4-[(4-bromo-2-cyanophenyl)carbamoyl]phenyl}methyl)phosphonate

Identifiers
CAS Number	133208-93-2
3D model (JSmol)	Interactive image
ChemSpider	116297
ECHA InfoCard	100.162.319
KEGG	D03747
PubChem CID	131601
UNII	07H1561618
CompTox Dashboard (EPA)	DTXSID20157989
- InChI: InChI=1S/C19H20BrN2O4P/c1-3-25-27(24,26-4-2)13-14-5-7-15(8-6-14)19(23)22-18-10-9-17(20)11-16(18)12-21/h5-11H,3-4,13H2,1-2H3,(H,22,23) Key: KPRTURMJVWXURQ-UHFFFAOYSA-N; InChI=1S/C19H20BrN2O4P/c1-3-25-27(24,26-4-2)13-14-5-7-15(8-6-14)19(23)22-18-10-9-17(20)11-16(18)12-21/h5-11H,3-4,13H2,1-2H3,(H,22,23); InChI=1S/C19H20BrN2O4P/c1-3-25-27(24,26-4-2)13-14-5-7-15(8-6-14)19(23)22-18-10-9-17(20)11-16(18)12-21/h5-11H,3-4,13H2,1-2H3,(H,22,23) Key: KPRTURMJVWXURQ-UHFFFAOYSA-N
- SMILES: Brc2cc(C#N)c(NC(=O)c1ccc(cc1)CP(=O)(OCC)OCC)cc2

Properties
Chemical formula	C_{19}H_{20}BrN_{2}O_{4}P
Molar mass	451.25
- Except where otherwise noted, data are given for materials in their standard state (at 25 °C [77 °F], 100 kPa). verify (what is ?) Infobox references

Ibrolipim (NO-1886) is a cholesterol lowering drug from the statin family, which acts as a lipoprotein lipase activator. The discovery of the "statin" mevalonic acid synthesis inhibitors focused new attention on control of blood lipid levels as a measure to stave off heart disease. A number of compounds have been found that treat elevated lipid levels by other diverse mechanisms. The phosphonic acid derivative ibrolipim is believed to lower those levels by accelerating fatty acid oxidation.
