= Streptomyces pratensis =

Scientific classification
- Domain: Bacteria
- Kingdom: Bacillati
- Phylum: Actinomycetota
- Class: Actinomycetia
- Order: Streptomycetales
- Family: Streptomycetaceae
- Genus: Streptomyces
- Species: S. pratensis

Binomial name
- Streptomyces pratensis Rong et al. 2014

Type strain
- CGMCC 4.6829, NRRL B-24916, Cald 193

Species of bacterium

Streptomyces pratensis is a bacterium species from the genus of Streptomyces.

== See also ==
- List of Streptomyces species
