= Falipamil =

Names
- Preferred IUPAC name 2-(3-{[2-(3,4-Dimethoxyphenyl)ethyl]methylamino}propyl)-5,6-dimethoxy-2,3-dihydro-1H-isoindol-1-one

Identifiers
CAS Number	77862-92-1
3D model (JSmol)	Interactive image
ChEMBL	ChEMBL1192913
ChemSpider	64357
PubChem CID	71222
UNII	N6A93ZMN7U
CompTox Dashboard (EPA)	DTXSID70228476
- InChI: InChI=1S/C24H32N2O5/c1-25(12-9-17-7-8-20(28-2)21(13-17)29-3)10-6-11-26-16-18-14-22(30-4)23(31-5)15-19(18)24(26)27/h7-8,13-15H,6,9-12,16H2,1-5H3 Key: UUMGNNQOCVDZDG-UHFFFAOYSA-N; InChI=1/C24H32N2O5/c1-25(12-9-17-7-8-20(28-2)21(13-17)29-3)10-6-11-26-16-18-14-22(30-4)23(31-5)15-19(18)24(26)27/h7-8,13-15H,6,9-12,16H2,1-5H3 Key: UUMGNNQOCVDZDG-UHFFFAOYAX
- SMILES: CN(CCCN1CC2=CC(=C(C=C2C1=O)OC)OC)CCC3=CC(=C(C=C3)OC)OC

Properties
Chemical formula	C_{24}H_{32}N_{2}O_{5}
Molar mass	428.52128
- Except where otherwise noted, data are given for materials in their standard state (at 25 °C [77 °F], 100 kPa). verify (what is ?) Infobox references

Falipamil is a calcium channel blocker.

== Research ==
Falipamil is a bradycardic drug focused on decreasing the heart rate of animals. The drug focuses on treating sinuses in some animals, with the most common experiments being conducted in dogs. Falipamil is commonly administered to reduce sinus, and different dosage administrations have proven to bear different results When given in small doses, the drug is effective in reducing sinus rate, but when given in high doses, the drug increases the sinus rate as the drug increases the atrial pumping rate, thus increasing the amount of body fluid pumped through the body to the face. When falipamil is administered, the drug decreases the ventricular rate of the heart, which in turn helps reduce the sinus rate in an organism.

Falipamil has different effects on the electrophysiological structure of the heart, where different dosages result in different heart activity rates with diverse vagolytic actions. Recent studies have been carried out on dogs to determine the effectiveness of the drug in treating sinuses. When administered to a conscious dog, the sinus heart rate of the dog increases, whereas when administered to a stale dog, the animal experiences a lessened heart rate. The electrophysiological result of administering falipamil shows that the drug decreases the maximal atrial driving frequency when administered to a conscious dog, which is an effective measure in reducing sinus in a living organism. Falipamil administration also shows that the administration of the drug increases the body's action potential exerting less bradycardic effects that are effective in reducing sinuses. Fallipamil does have different recovery times when administered to dogs involved in different activities. Intact dogs are likely to have short sinus recovery time-conscious dogs. Falipamil has a positive effect on the heart's refractory period, where the drug prolongs the atrial refractory period.
