= Fluproquazone =

Chemical compound

Clinical data
- ATC code: none

Identifiers
- IUPAC name: 4-(4-fluorophenyl)-7-methyl-1-propan-2-ylquinazolin-2-one
- CAS Number: 40507-23-1
- PubChem CID: 38503
- ChemSpider: 35289
- UNII: U4K85O58HD
- KEGG: D04229
- CompTox Dashboard (EPA): DTXSID70193519

Chemical and physical data
- Formula: C_{18}H_{17}FN_{2}O
- Molar mass: 296.345 g·mol^{−1}
- 3D model (JSmol): Interactive image
- SMILES: Fc3ccc(C/1=N/C(=O)N(c2cc(ccc\12)C)C(C)C)cc3
- InChI: InChI=1S/C18H17FN2O/c1-11(2)21-16-10-12(3)4-9-15(16)17(20-18(21)22)13-5-7-14(19)8-6-13/h4-11H,1-3H3; Key:ZWOUXWWGKJBAHQ-UHFFFAOYSA-N

Fluproquazone (trade name Tormosyl, RF 46-790 ) was a quinazolinone derivative with potent analgesic, antipyretic, and anti-inflammatory effects discovered by Sandoz. It was withdrawn during development due to liver toxicity.
