= Fenticlor =

Chemical compound

Clinical data
- Routes of administration: topical

Identifiers
- IUPAC name: Bis[2-hydroxy-5-chlorophenyl] sulfide
- CAS Number: 97-24-5
- PubChem CID: 7329
- ChemSpider: 7052
- UNII: D61659OVD0
- KEGG: D04164
- ChEMBL: ChEMBL473535
- CompTox Dashboard (EPA): DTXSID4026137
- ECHA InfoCard: 100.002.336

Chemical and physical data
- Formula: C_{12}H_{8}Cl_{2}O_{2}S
- Molar mass: 287.15 g·mol^{−1}
- Melting point: 174 °C (345 °F)

Fenticlor (also spelled fentichlor) is an antibacterial and antifungal agent for topical use. It is an antimicrobial agent. It is also used in veterinary medicine.

== Synthesis ==
It is prepared by the AlCl_{3}-catalyzed reaction of 4-chlorophenol with sulfur dichloride. It can also be prepared by chlorination of bis[2-hydroxyphenyl]sulfide.

== Safety ==
The LD_{50} (rats, oral) of fenticlor is 3250 mg/kg. It may cause photosensitivity.
