= Formetorex =

Substituted amphetamine appetite suppressant drug

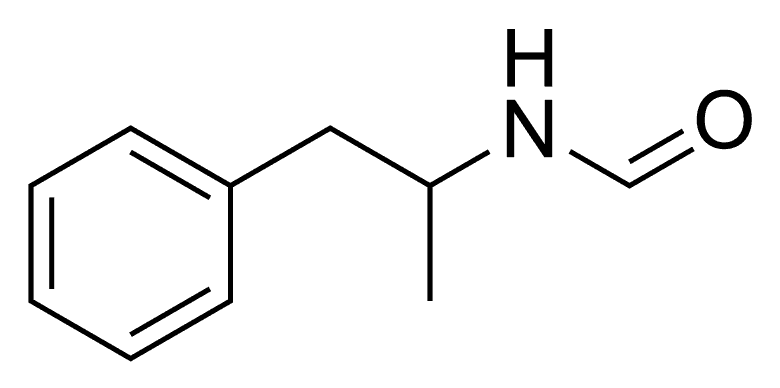

Names
- Preferred IUPAC name N-(1-Phenylpropan-2-yl)formamide
- Other names Formetorex; N-Formylamphetamine; N-(alpha-Methylphenethyl)formamide

Identifiers
CAS Number	15302-18-8
3D model (JSmol)	Interactive image
Beilstein Reference	1563
ChEMBL	ChEMBL1395071
ChemSpider	59055
PubChem CID	65614
UNII	30555LM9SQ
CompTox Dashboard (EPA)	DTXSID6046135
- InChI: InChI=1S/C10H13NO/c1-9(11-8-12)7-10-5-3-2-4-6-10/h2-6,8-9H,7H2,1H3,(H,11,12)
- SMILES: CC(CC1=CC=CC=C1)NC=O

Properties
Chemical formula	C_{10}H_{13}NO
Molar mass	163.220 g·mol^{−1}
- Except where otherwise noted, data are given for materials in their standard state (at 25 °C [77 °F], 100 kPa). Infobox references

Formetorex (INN), also known as formetamide or N-formylamphetamine, is a substituted amphetamine described as an anorectic which does not appear to have ever been marketed.

Formetorex is also an intermediate in the production of amphetamine by the "Leuckart reaction." It is also commonly found as an impurity in clandestine labs where this synthesis method is used. Due to the simplicity of the Leuckart reaction, it is the most popular synthetic route employed for the illicit manufacture of amphetamines. The synthesis involves a non-metal reduction that is typically carried out in three steps. For amphetamine synthesis, a mixture of phenylacetone and formamide (sometimes in the presence of formic acid) or ammonium formate, is heated until a condensation reaction results in the intermediate product, formetamide. In the second step, formetamide is hydrolysed using hydrochloric acid, and the reaction mixture is then basified, isolated, and steam distilled to produce the free base. The final step, the product is dissolved in an organic solvent and precipitated as the sulphate salt of amphetamine by adding sulfuric acid.

Amphetamine synthesis via the Leuckart reaction

It can in theory also serve as a precursor to methamphetamine, by removing the aldehyde group with a strong reducing agent such as LAH (in PiHKAL, Shulgin describes the analogous synthesis of MDMA by reduction of N-formyl-3,4-methylenedioxyamphetamine).
