= Fenpentadiol =

Chemical compound

Clinical data
- Routes of administration: Oral
- ATC code: none

Legal status
- Legal status: In general: ℞ (Prescription only)

Identifiers
- IUPAC name: 2-(4-chlorophenyl)-4-methyl-pentane-2,4-diol
- CAS Number: 15687-18-0
- PubChem CID: 85896
- ChemSpider: 77482
- UNII: BLO7300903
- ChEMBL: ChEMBL2106273
- CompTox Dashboard (EPA): DTXSID9023047
- ECHA InfoCard: 100.036.150

Chemical and physical data
- Formula: C_{12}H_{17}ClO_{2}
- Molar mass: 228.72 g·mol^{−1}

Fenpentadiol (INN; brand names Tredum, Trefenum; developmental code Rd-292; also known as phenpentanediol) is a drug described as a tranquilizer and antidepressant that was formerly marketed in Europe. It also has stimulant, sedative, and anxiolytic effects, with the latter two occurring only at higher doses.

The following literature incidence of the fenpentadiol has been found and quoted:

In three articles the properties of a new psychotropic agent from the series of araliphatic alcohols — phenpentanediol (CXV) — were described (477-479). It is not easy to place this substance anywhere in the pharmacodynamic system of psychotropic agents: on the one hand it potentiates the barbiturate narcosis, on the other it increases motility and exploratory activity in mice and potentiates the effects of amphetamine.

— Farmaco. Edizione Scientifica. 1974. p. 90.
