= List of corticosteroid esters =

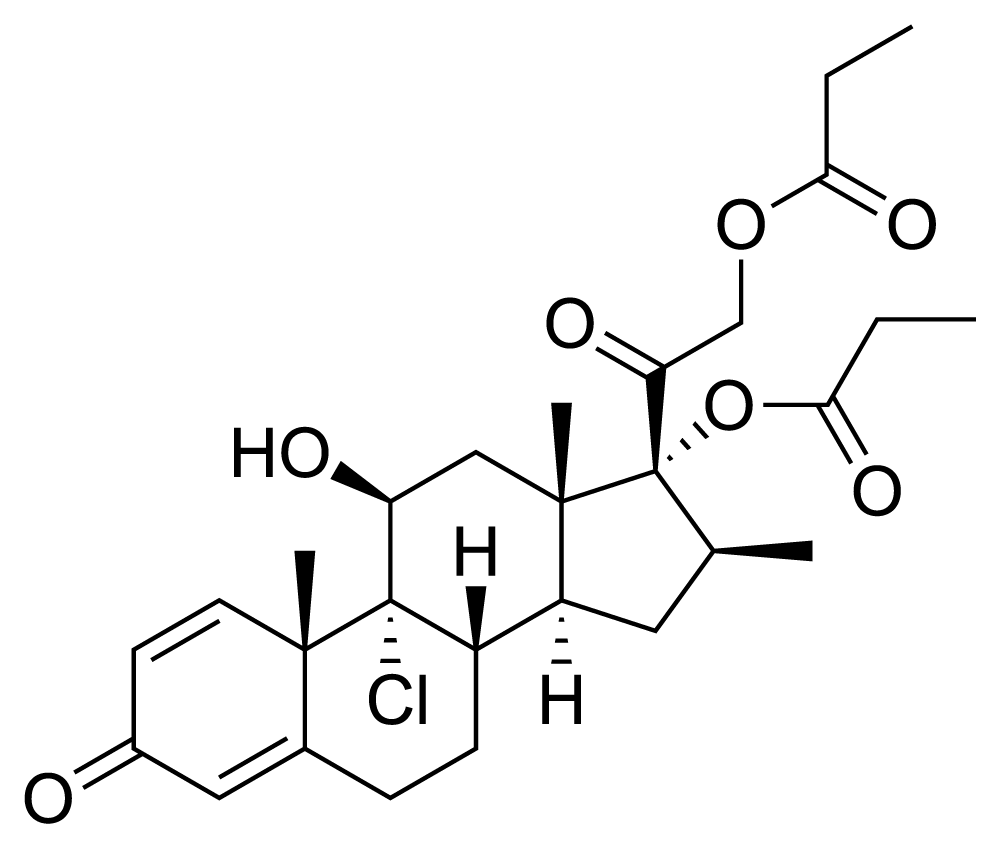
Beclometasone dipropionate, an example of a widely used corticosteroid ester. Note the propionate groups at the C17α and C21α positions (top right corner).

This is a list of corticosteroid esters, including esters of steroidal glucocorticoids and mineralocorticoids.

== Esters of natural corticosteroids ==
=== Desoxycortone esters ===
- Desoxycortone acetate (deoxycortone acetate; desoxycorticosterone acetate)
- Desoxycortone cypionate (deoxycortone cypionate; desoxycorticosterone cypionate)
- Desoxycortone enanthate (deoxycortone enanthate; deoxycorticosterone enanthate)
- Desoxycortone glucoside (deoxycortone glucoside; deoxycorticosterone glucoside)
- Desoxycortone pivalate (deoxycortone pivalate; deoxycorticosterone pivalate)

=== Hydrocortisone esters ===
- Benzodrocortisone (hydrocortisone 17-benzoate)
- Hydrocortamate (hydrocortisone 21-(diethylamino)acetate)
- Hydrocortisone aceponate (hydrocortisone 21-acetate 17α-propionate)
- Hydrocortisone acetate
- Hydrocortisone bendazac
- Hydrocortisone buteprate (hydrocortisone 17α-butyrate 21-propionate)
- Hydrocortisone butyrate (hydrocortisone 17α-butyrate)
- Hydrocortisone 21-butyrate
- Hydrocortisone cypionate (hydrocortisone cyclopentanepropionate)
- Hydrocortisone phosphate
- Hydrocortisone succinate (hydrocortisone hemisuccinate)
- Hydrocortisone tebutate
- Hydrocortisone valerate
- Hydrocortisone xanthogenic acid

=== Esters of other natural corticosteroids ===
- 11-Dehydrocorticosterone acetate
- Cortifen (cortodoxone chlorphenacyl ester)
- Cortisone acetate
- Corticosterone acetate
- Corticosterone benzoate
- Cortodoxone acetate

== Esters of synthetic corticosteroids ==
=== Beclometasone esters ===
- Beclometasone dipropionate (beclomethasone dipropionate)
- Beclometasone salicylate
- Beclometasone valeroacetate

=== Betamethasone esters ===
- Betamethasone acetate
- Betamethasone acibutate (betamethasone 21-acetate 17α-isobutyrate)
- Betamethasone adamantoate
- Betamethasone benzoate
- Betamethasone dipropionate
- Betamethasone divalerate
- Betamethasone phosphate (betamethasone phosphate)
- Betamethasone succinate
- Betamethasone valerate
- Betamethasone valeroacetate (betamethasone 21-acetate 17α-valerate)
- Cortobenzolone (betamethasone salicylate)

=== Clocortolone esters ===
- Clocortolone acetate
- Clocortolone caproate
- Clocortolone pivalate

=== Dexamethasone esters ===
- Dexamethasone acefurate
- Dexamethasone acetate (flumeprednisolone)
- Dexamethasone cipecilate
- Dexamethasone diethylaminoacetate
- Dexamethasone dipropionate
- Dexamethasone isonicotinate
- Dexamethasone linoleate
- Dexamethasone metasulphobenzoate
- Dexamethasone palmitate
- Dexamethasone phosphate
- Dexamethasone pivalate
- Dexamethasone succinate
- Dexamethasone sulfate
- Dexamethasone tebutate (dexamethasone tert-butylacetate)
- Dexamethasone troxundate
- Dexamethasone valerate

=== Fluocinolone acetonide esters ===
- Ciprocinonide (fluocinolone acetonide cyclopropylcarboxylate)
- Fluocinonide (fluocinolone acetonide 21-acetate)
- Procinonide (fluocinolone acetonide propionate)

=== Fluocortolone esters ===
- Fluocortin (fluocortolone-21-carboxylate)
- Fluocortin butyl (fluocortolone-21-carboxylate 21-butylate)
- Fluocortolone caproate
- Fluocortolone pivalate

=== Fluprednisolone esters ===
- Fluprednisolone acetate
- Fluprednisolone succinate (fluprednisolone hemisuccinate)
- Fluprednisolone valerate

=== Methylprednisolone esters ===
- Methylprednisolone aceponate
- Methylprednisolone acetate
- Methylprednisolone cyclopentylpropionate
- Methylprednisolone phosphate
- Methylprednisolone succinate (methylprednisolone hemisuccinate)
- Methylprednisolone suleptanate

=== Prednisolone esters ===
- Prednazate (prednisolone succinate and perphenazine compound)
- Prednazoline (prednisolone phosphate and fenoxazoline compound)
- Prednicarbate (prednisolone 17-(ethyl carbonate) 21-propionate)
- Prednimustine (prednisolone chlorambucil ester)
- Prednisolamate (prednisolone diethylaminoacetate)
- Prednisolone acetate
- Prednisolone hexanoate
- Prednisolone metasulphobenzoate (prednisolone 21-(3-sulfobenzoate))
- Prednisolone palmitate
- Prednisolone phosphate
- Prednisolone piperidinoacetate
- Prednisolone pivalate
- Prednisolone steaglate (prednisolone stearoyl-glycolate)
- Prednisolone stearoylglycolate
- Prednisolone succinate (prednisolone hemisuccinate)
- Prednisolone sulfate
- Prednisolone tebutate (prednisolone tert-butylacetate)
- Prednisolone tetrahydrophthalate
- Prednisolone valerate
- Prednisolone valeroacetate

=== Prednisone esters ===
- Prednisone acetate
- Prednisone palmitate
- Prednisone succinate

=== Tixocortol esters ===
- Butixocort (tixocortol butyrate)
- Butixocort propionate (tixocortol butyrate propionate)
- Tixocortol pivalate

=== Triamcinolone acetonide esters ===
- Flupamesone (triamcinolone acetonide metembonate)
- Triamcinolone acetonide phosphate
- Triamcinolone acetonide succinate (triamcinolone acetonide hemisuccinate)
- Triamcinolone benetonide (triamcinolone acetonide 21-(benzoyl-β-aminoisobutyrate))
- Triamcinolone furetonide (triamcinolone acetonide 21-(2-benzofurancarboxylate))
- Triamcinolone hexacetonide (triamcinolone acetonide 21-(tert-butylacetate))

=== Esters of other synthetic corticosteroids ===
- Δ^{7}-Prednisolone 21-acetate
- Alclometasone dipropionate
- Amcinonide (triamcinolone acetate cyclopentanonide)
- Chloroprednisone acetate
- Ciclometasone (a corticosteroid 21-[4-[(acetylamino)methyl]cyclohexyl]carboxylate ester)
- Clobetasol propionate
- Clobetasone butyrate
- Cloprednol acetate
- Cormetasone acetate
- Cortivazol (a corticosteroid 21-acetate ester)
- Cloticasone propionate
- Deflazacort (a corticosteroid 21-acetate ester)
- Deprodone propionate
- Desonide phosphate
- Desonide pivalate
- Dichlorisone acetate
- Dichlorisone diacetate
- Diflorasone diacetate
- Diflucortolone pivalate
- Diflucortolone valerate
- Difluprednate (difluoroprednisolone butyrate acetate)
- Dimesone acetate
- Drocinonide phosphate
- Etiprednol dicloacetate
- Fluazacort (a corticosteroid 21-acetate ester)
- Fludrocortisone acetate
- Flumetasone acetate
- Flumetasone pivalate
- Flunisolide acetate
- Fluorometholone acetate
- Fluperolone acetate
- Fluprednidene acetate
- Fluticasone furoate
- Fluticasone propionate
- Formocortal (a corticosteroid 21-acetate ester)
- Halopredone acetate (halopredone diacetate)
- Icometasone enbutate
- Isoflupredone acetate
- Locicortolone dicibate
- Loteprednol etabonate
- Meclorisone dibutyrate
- Meprednisone acetate
- Meprednisone succinate (meprednisone hemisuccinate)
- Mometasone furoate
- Nicocortonide (a corticosteroid 21-isonicotinate ester)
- Nicocortonide acetate
- Paramethasone acetate
- Paramethasone phosphate
- Prebediolone acetate
- Prednylidene diethylaminoacetate
- Rofleponide palmitate
- Ticabesone propionate
- Timobesone acetate
- Triamcinolone aminobenzal benzamidoisobutyrate
- Triamcinolone diacetate
- Ulobetasol propionate (halobetasol propionate)

== See also ==
- Steroid ester
- List of corticosteroid cyclic ketals
- List of corticosteroids
- List of steroid esters
