= C24H31FO6 =

The molecular formula C_{24}H_{31}FO_{6} (molar mass: 434.50 g/mol) may refer to:

- Betamethasone acetate
- Dexamethasone acetate
- Fluperolone acetate
- Flunisolide
- Paramethasone acetate
- Triamcinolone acetonide
