= Prednazoline =

Chemical compound

Combination of
- Prednisolone phosphate: Glucocorticoid
- Fenoxazoline: Vasoconstrictor

Clinical data
- Other names: Prednisolone phosphate compound with fenoxazoline; LD-4003; 11β,17α,21-Trihydroxypregna-1,4-diene-3,20-dione 21-(dihydrogen phosphate) compound with 2-[(2-isopropylphenoxy)methyl]-2-imidazoline
- Drug class: Corticosteroid; Glucocorticoid

Identifiers
- CAS Number: 6693-90-9
- PubChem CID: 72077
- ChemSpider: 65063
- UNII: 45IOG00G0B
- CompTox Dashboard (EPA): DTXSID40985600

Prednazoline, a compound of prednisolone phosphate with fenoxazoline, is a synthetic corticosteroid as well as vasoconstrictor and α-adrenergic sympathomimetic.

== See also ==
- Prednazate
- Prednimustine
