= C29H33FO6 =

The molecular formula C_{29}H_{33}FO_{6} (molar mass: 496.58 g/mol, exact mass: 496.2261 u) may refer to:

- Amcinafide, or triamcinolone acetophenide
- Betamethasone benzoate
