= C29H42O6 =

The molecular formula C_{29}H_{42}O_{6} may refer to:

- Hydrocortisone cypionate, a synthetic glucocorticoid corticosteroid and a corticosteroid ester
- Kendomycin, an anticancer macrolide
