= C23H30O6 =

The molecular formula C_{23}H_{30}O_{6} may refer to:

- Cortisone acetate, a synthetic glucocorticoid corticosteroid and corticosteroid ester which is marketed in many countries throughout the world
- Prednisolone acetate, a synthetic glucocorticoid corticosteroid and a corticosteroid ester, the 21-acetate ester of prednisolone
- Citreoviridin, a mycotoxin
