= C26H38O4 =

The molecular formula C_{26}H_{38}O_{4} may refer to:

- Desoxycorticosterone pivalate
- Gestonorone caproate
- Oxabolone cipionate
- Lupulone
