= Methylprednisolone suleptanate =

Chemical compound

Clinical data
- Trade names: Medrosol, Promedrol
- Other names: PNU-67590A; U-67590A; Methylprednisolone 21-(8-(methyl-(2-sulfoethyl)amino)-1,8-dioxooctanoate); 11β,17α-Dihydroxy-6α-methyl-21-((8-(methyl(2-sulfoethyl)amino)-1,8-dioxooctyl)oxy)pregna-1,4-diene-3,20-dione
- Routes of administration: Intravenous administration
- Drug class: Corticosteroid; Glucocorticoid

Identifiers
- IUPAC name: 2-[[8-[2-[(6S,8S,9S,10R,11S,13S,14S,17R)-11,17-dihydroxy-6,10,13-trimethyl-3-oxo-7,8,9,11,12,14,15,16-octahydro-6H-cyclopenta[a]phenanthren-17-yl]-2-oxoethoxy]-8-oxooctanoyl]-methylamino]ethanesulfonic acid
- CAS Number: 121807-10-1
- PubChem CID: 56068
- ChemSpider: 50613
- UNII: 3O5T2NJE2D
- ChEBI: CHEBI:135864
- ChEMBL: ChEMBL1697783
- CompTox Dashboard (EPA): DTXSID7023304

Chemical and physical data
- Formula: C_{33}H_{49}NO_{10}S
- Molar mass: 651.81 g·mol^{−1}
- 3D model (JSmol): Interactive image
- SMILES: C[C@H]1C[C@H]2[C@@H]3CC[C@@]([C@]3(C[C@@H]([C@@H]2[C@@]4(C1=CC(=O)C=C4)C)O)C)(C(=O)COC(=O)CCCCCCC(=O)N(C)CCS(=O)(=O)O)O
- InChI: InChI=1S/C33H49NO10S/c1-21-17-23-24-12-14-33(40,32(24,3)19-26(36)30(23)31(2)13-11-22(35)18-25(21)31)27(37)20-44-29(39)10-8-6-5-7-9-28(38)34(4)15-16-45(41,42)43/h11,13,18,21,23-24,26,30,36,40H,5-10,12,14-17,19-20H2,1-4H3,(H,41,42,43)/t21-,23-,24-,26-,30+,31-,32-,33-/m0/s1; Key:PSCNNGGPKIBAHB-WFVOKNHCSA-N

Methylprednisolone suleptanate, sold under the brand names Medrosol and Promedrol, is a synthetic glucocorticoid corticosteroid and a corticosteroid ester—specifically, the C21 suleptanate 21-(8-(methyl-(2-sulfoethyl)amino)-1,8-dioxooctanoate) ester of methylprednisolone. It acts as a prodrug of methylprednisolone. Methylprednisolone suleptanate was developed as an improved alternative to methylprednisolone acetate (Depo-Medrol) with greater water solubility for use by intravenous administration.

== See also ==
- List of corticosteroid esters § Methylprednisolone esters
