= Prednazate =

Chemical compound

Combination of
- Prednisolone: Glucocorticoid
- Perphenazine: Major tranquilizer

Clinical data
- Trade names: Sixty Six-20 (with chlorpheniramine)
- Other names: Prednisolone hemisuccinate compound with perphenazine; SCH-6620; 11β,17α,21-Trihydroxypregna-1,4-diene-3,20-dione, 21-(hydrogen succinate), compound with 4-(3-(2-chlorophenothiazin-10-yl)propyl)-1-piperazineethanol (1:1)
- Drug class: Corticosteroid; Glucocorticoid

Identifiers
- CAS Number: 5714-75-0
- PubChem CID: 10010848
- ChemSpider: 8186427
- UNII: 71099P640P
- KEGG: D05600
- CompTox Dashboard (EPA): DTXSID70972604

Prednazate, a combination of prednisolone hemisuccinate with perphenazine, is a synthetic glucocorticoid corticosteroid as well as typical antipsychotic and sedative/tranquilizer. It was a component of Sixty Six-20, a combination of prednazate (prednisolone hemisuccinate and perphenazine) and chlorpheniramine.

== See also ==
- Prednazoline
- Prednimustine
