= Methylprednisolone aceponate =

Chemical compound

Clinical data
- Trade names: Advantan, Avancort, others
- Other names: Methylprednisolone 17α-propionate 21-acetate; ZK-91588
- AHFS/Drugs.com: Consumer Drug Information
- ATC code: D07AC14 (WHO)

Legal status
- Legal status: AU: S4 (Prescription only)

Identifiers
- CAS Number: 86401-95-8
- PubChem CID: 63019
- DrugBank: DB14643
- ChemSpider: 56717
- UNII: ET54W9J4U2
- ChEBI: CHEBI:135762
- ChEMBL: ChEMBL1697782
- CompTox Dashboard (EPA): DTXSID2023301
- ECHA InfoCard: 100.184.880

Chemical and physical data
- Formula: C_{27}H_{36}O_{7}
- Molar mass: 472.578 g·mol^{−1}
- 3D model (JSmol): Interactive image
- SMILES: CCC(=O)O[C@@]1(CC[C@@H]2[C@@]1(C[C@@H]([C@H]3[C@H]2C[C@@H](C4=CC(=O)C=C[C@]34C)C)O)C)C(=O)COC(=O)C
- InChI: InChI=1S/C27H36O7/c1-6-23(32)34-27(22(31)14-33-16(3)28)10-8-19-18-11-15(2)20-12-17(29)7-9-25(20,4)24(18)21(30)13-26(19,27)5/h7,9,12,15,18-19,21,24,30H,6,8,10-11,13-14H2,1-5H3/t15-,18-,19-,21-,24+,25-,26-,27-/m0/s1; Key:DALKLAYLIPSCQL-YPYQNWSCSA-N

Methylprednisolone aceponate, or methylprednisolone acetate propionate, sold under the brand names Advantan and Avancort, is a glucocorticoid and a corticosteroid ester—specifically the C17α propionate and C21 acetate diester of methylprednisolone.

In Russia and some other countries the drug is available in 4 dosage forms differing in consistency and water content: emulsion (or lotion), cream, ointment and fatty ointment.

== Synthesis ==
ChemDrug Synthesis: Patent:

- methylprednisolone [83-43-2] (1)
- Triethyl orthopropionate [115-80-0] (2)
- PC13131717 (3)
- [79512-61-1] (4)

== See also ==
- List of corticosteroid esters § Methylprednisolone esters
