= Dexamethasone acefurate =

Chemical compound

Clinical data
- Drug class: Corticosteroid; Glucocorticoid

Identifiers
- IUPAC name: [(8S,9R,10S,11S,13S,14S,16R,17R)-17-(2-Acetyloxyacetyl)-9-fluoro-11-hydroxy-10,13,16-trimethyl-3-oxo-6,7,8,11,12,14,15,16-octahydrocyclopenta[a]phenanthren-17-yl] furan-2-carboxylate
- CAS Number: 83880-70-0
- PubChem CID: 656777
- ChemSpider: 571093
- UNII: W4N6E1T46B
- KEGG: D02591
- ChEBI: CHEBI:135819
- ChEMBL: ChEMBL1697787
- CompTox Dashboard (EPA): DTXSID3022900

Chemical and physical data
- Formula: C_{29}H_{33}FO_{8}
- Molar mass: 528.573 g·mol^{−1}
- 3D model (JSmol): Interactive image
- SMILES: C[C@@H]1C[C@H]2[C@@H]3CCC4=CC(=O)C=C[C@@]4([C@]3([C@H](C[C@@]2([C@]1(C(=O)COC(=O)C)OC(=O)C5=CC=CO5)C)O)F)C
- InChI: InChI=1S/C29H33FO8/c1-16-12-21-20-8-7-18-13-19(32)9-10-26(18,3)28(20,30)23(33)14-27(21,4)29(16,24(34)15-37-17(2)31)38-25(35)22-6-5-11-36-22/h5-6,9-11,13,16,20-21,23,33H,7-8,12,14-15H2,1-4H3/t16-,20+,21+,23+,26+,27+,28+,29+/m1/s1; Key:DDIWRLSEGOVQQD-BJRLRHTOSA-N

Dexamethasone acefurate is a synthetic glucocorticoid corticosteroid and a corticosteroid ester.
