= Methylprednisolone succinate =

Chemical compound

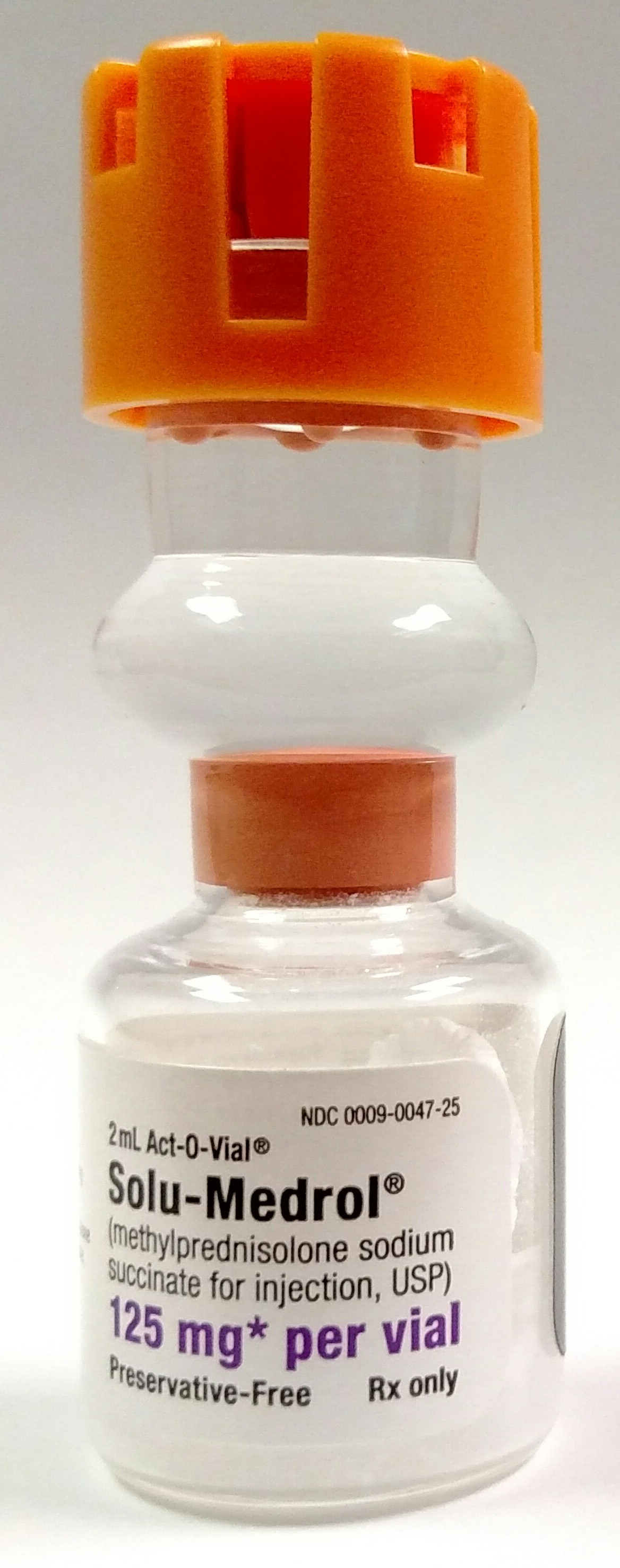
- Molecular structure and glass vial preparation

Clinical data
- Trade names: Solu-Medrol, Solu-Medrone, Urbason, others
- Other names: Methylprednisolone hemisuccinate; 6α-Methylprednisolone 21-hemisuccinate
- AHFS/Drugs.com: Monograph
- License data: US DailyMed: Methylprednisolone succinate
- Routes of administration: Intravenous injection
- Drug class: Corticosteroid; Glucocorticoid
- ATC code: D07AA01 (WHO)

Legal status
- Legal status: CA: ℞-only; US: ℞-only

Identifiers
- IUPAC name: 4-[2-[(6S,8S,9S,10R,11S,13S,14S,17R)-11,17-dihydroxy-6,10,13-trimethyl-3-oxo-7,8,9,11,12,14,15,16-octahydro-6H-cyclopenta[a]phenanthren-17-yl]-2-oxoethoxy]-4-oxobutanoic acid
- CAS Number: 2921-57-5
- PubChem CID: 16923
- DrugBank: DB14644
- ChemSpider: 16034
- UNII: 5GMR90S4KN
- KEGG: D05000
- ChEBI: CHEBI:135765
- ChEMBL: ChEMBL1201265
- CompTox Dashboard (EPA): DTXSID2023303
- ECHA InfoCard: 100.017.416

Chemical and physical data
- Formula: C_{26}H_{34}O_{8}
- Molar mass: 474.550 g·mol^{−1}
- 3D model (JSmol): Interactive image
- SMILES: C[C@H]1C[C@H]2[C@@H]3CC[C@@]([C@]3(C[C@@H]([C@@H]2[C@@]4(C1=CC(=O)C=C4)C)O)C)(C(=O)COC(=O)CCC(=O)O)O
- InChI: InChI=1S/C26H34O8/c1-14-10-16-17-7-9-26(33,20(29)13-34-22(32)5-4-21(30)31)25(17,3)12-19(28)23(16)24(2)8-6-15(27)11-18(14)24/h6,8,11,14,16-17,19,23,28,33H,4-5,7,9-10,12-13H2,1-3H3,(H,30,31)/t14-,16-,17-,19-,23+,24-,25-,26-/m0/s1; Key:IMBXEJJVJRTNOW-XYMSELFBSA-N

Methylprednisolone succinate, sold under the brand name Solu-Medrol among others, is a synthetic glucocorticoid corticosteroid and a corticosteroid ester—specifically the C21 succinate ester of methylprednisolone—which is used by intravenous administration. Methylprednisolone succinate is provided as two different salts when used as a pharmaceutical drug: a sodium salt (methylprednisolone sodium succinate; brand name Solu-Medrol, others) and a hydrogen salt (methylprednisolone hemisuccinate or methylprednisolone hydrogen succinate; brand name Urbason).

Methylprednisolone succinate was approved for medical use in the United States in 1959.
