= Triamcinolone diacetate =

Chemical compound

Clinical data
- Other names: Aristocort diacetate; Triamcinolone 16,21-diacetate
- Drug class: Corticosteroid; Glucocorticoid

Identifiers
- IUPAC name: [2-[(8S,9R,10S,11S,13S,14S,16R,17S)-16-Acetyloxy-9-fluoro-11,17-dihydroxy-10,13-dimethyl-3-oxo-6,7,8,11,12,14,15,16-octahydrocyclopenta[a]phenanthren-17-yl]-2-oxoethyl] acetate
- CAS Number: 67-78-7
- PubChem CID: 6216
- UNII: A73MM2Q32P
- CompTox Dashboard (EPA): DTXSID0048713
- ECHA InfoCard: 100.000.608

Chemical and physical data
- Formula: C_{25}H_{31}FO_{8}
- Molar mass: 478.513 g·mol^{−1}
- 3D model (JSmol): Interactive image
- SMILES: CC(=O)OCC(=O)[C@]1([C@@H](C[C@@H]2[C@@]1(C[C@@H]([C@]3([C@H]2CCC4=CC(=O)C=C[C@@]43C)F)O)C)OC(=O)C)O
- InChI: InChI=1S/C25H31FO8/c1-13(27)33-12-20(31)25(32)21(34-14(2)28)10-18-17-6-5-15-9-16(29)7-8-22(15,3)24(17,26)19(30)11-23(18,25)4/h7-9,17-19,21,30,32H,5-6,10-12H2,1-4H3/t17-,18-,19-,21+,22-,23-,24-,25+/m0/s1; Key:XGMPVBXKDAHORN-RBWIMXSLSA-N

Triamcinolone diacetate is a synthetic glucocorticoid corticosteroid and a corticosteroid ester.
