= Prednisolone acetate =

Chemical compound

Clinical data
- Other names: Prednisolone 21-acetate
- Drug class: Corticosteroid; Glucocorticoid

Identifiers
- IUPAC name: [2-[(8S,9S,10R,11S,13S,14S,17R)-11,17-Dihydroxy-10,13-dimethyl-3-oxo-7,8,9,11,12,14,15,16-octahydro-6H-cyclopenta[a]phenanthren-17-yl]-2-oxoethyl] acetate
- CAS Number: 52-21-1
- PubChem CID: 5834
- DrugBank: DB15566
- UNII: 8B2807733D
- KEGG: C08180
- ChEBI: CHEBI:8380
- ChEMBL: ChEMBL1152
- CompTox Dashboard (EPA): DTXSID3023502
- ECHA InfoCard: 100.000.123

Chemical and physical data
- Formula: C_{23}H_{30}O_{6}
- Molar mass: 402.487 g·mol^{−1}
- 3D model (JSmol): Interactive image
- Melting point: 240 °C (464 °F)
- SMILES: CC(=O)OCC(=O)[C@]1(CC[C@@H]2[C@@]1(C[C@@H]([C@H]3[C@H]2CCC4=CC(=O)C=C[C@]34C)O)C)O
- InChI: InChI=1S/C23H30O6/c1-13(24)29-12-19(27)23(28)9-7-17-16-5-4-14-10-15(25)6-8-21(14,2)20(16)18(26)11-22(17,23)3/h6,8,10,16-18,20,26,28H,4-5,7,9,11-12H2,1-3H3/t16-,17-,18-,20+,21-,22-,23-/m0/s1; Key:LRJOMUJRLNCICJ-JZYPGELDSA-N

Prednisolone acetate is a synthetic glucocorticoid corticosteroid and a corticosteroid ester. It is the 21-acetate ester of prednisolone.

== Safety ==
Prednisolone acetate is acutely toxic with an LD50 of >240 mg/kg for a rat and 3500 mg/kg for a mouse. Effects may present delayed. Target organs include adrenal cortex, bones, and eyes. It is also a known teratogen. Class B PPE should be worn when working with this chemical. Any contact with this chemical should be taken seriously and the affected person taken to the hospital.

== Overdose ==
Symptoms of overdose may include altered mental status with psychosis, burning or itching skin, seizures, deafness, depression, dry skin, heart rhythm disturbances, hypertension, increase appetite, increased infection risk, muscle weakness, nausea and vomiting, nervousness, sleepiness, stopping of menstrual cycle, swelling in lower legs, weak bones, weakness, and worsening of health conditions.

Most common route of overdose is via ingestion.

Treatment may involve IV fluids, activated carbon, laxativea, breathing support and additional medications to alleviate symptoms.

== Physical properties ==
Material is a white powder in its pure form. Good solubility in Chloroform, Methanol, and Ethanol. Poorly soluble in water. Melting point of this material is 240 °C. UV-VIS spectroscopy can be used to determine purity and identity, resolving a peak around 244 nm in water.
