= Betamethasone phosphate =

Chemical compound

Clinical data
- Other names: Betamethasone 21-phosphate disodium salt
- Drug class: Corticosteroid; Glucocorticoid

Identifiers
- IUPAC name: Disodium (11β,16β)-9-fluoro-11,17-dihydroxy-16-methyl-3,20-dioxopregna-1,4-dien-21-yl phosphate
- CAS Number: 360-63-4
- PubChem CID: 65478
- DrugBank: DB00443
- ChemSpider: 58930
- UNII: YJO1F9W10R
- KEGG: D00972
- ChEBI: CHEBI:3078
- ChEMBL: ChEMBL1200762
- CompTox Dashboard (EPA): DTXSID8047137
- ECHA InfoCard: 100.005.271

Chemical and physical data
- Formula: C_{22}H_{28}FNa_{2}O_{8}P
- Molar mass: 516.410 g·mol^{−1}
- 3D model (JSmol): Interactive image
- SMILES: C[C@H]1C[C@H]2[C@@H]3CCC4=CC(=O)C=C[C@@]4([C@]3([C@H](C[C@@]2([C@]1(C(=O)COP(=O)([O-])[O-])O)C)O)F)C.[Na+].[Na+]
- InChI: InChI=1S/C22H30FO8P.2Na/c1-12-8-16-15-5-4-13-9-14(24)6-7-19(13,2)21(15,23)17(25)10-20(16,3)22(12,27)18(26)11-31-32(28,29)30;;/h6-7,9,12,15-17,25,27H,4-5,8,10-11H2,1-3H3,(H2,28,29,30);;/q;2*+1/p-2/t12-,15-,16-,17-,19-,20-,21-,22-;;/m0../s1; Key:PLCQGRYPOISRTQ-LWCNAHDDSA-L

Betamethasone sodium phosphate is a synthetic glucocorticoid corticosteroid and a corticosteroid ester. It is the disodium salt of the phosphate ester of betamethasone.

== See also ==
- Betamethasone acetate
