= Chloroprednisone acetate =

Chemical compound

Clinical data
- Trade names: Localyn, Adremycine, Topilan
- Other names: Chloroprednisone 21-acetate
- Drug class: Corticosteroid; Glucocorticoid

Identifiers
- IUPAC name: [2-[(6S,8S,9S,10R,13S,14S,17R)-6-Chloro-17-hydroxy-10,13-dimethyl-3,11-dioxo-6,7,8,9,12,14,15,16-octahydrocyclopenta[a]phenanthren-17-yl]-2-oxoethyl] acetate
- CAS Number: 14066-79-6
- PubChem CID: 235970
- ChemSpider: 205918
- UNII: Z243A6BHCS
- ChEMBL: ChEMBL2107595
- CompTox Dashboard (EPA): DTXSID601043077
- ECHA InfoCard: 100.034.458

Chemical and physical data
- Formula: C_{23}H_{27}ClO_{6}
- Molar mass: 434.91 g·mol^{−1}
- 3D model (JSmol): Interactive image
- SMILES: CC(=O)OCC(=O)[C@]1(CC[C@@H]2[C@@]1(CC(=O)[C@H]3[C@H]2C[C@@H](C4=CC(=O)C=C[C@]34C)Cl)C)O
- InChI: InChI=1S/C23H27ClO6/c1-12(25)30-11-19(28)23(29)7-5-15-14-9-17(24)16-8-13(26)4-6-21(16,2)20(14)18(27)10-22(15,23)3/h4,6,8,14-15,17,20,29H,5,7,9-11H2,1-3H3/t14-,15-,17-,20+,21-,22-,23-/m0/s1; Key:RACDDTQBAFEERP-PLTZVPCUSA-N

Chloroprednisone acetate is a synthetic glucocorticoid corticosteroid and a corticosteroid ester. It is the 21-acetate ester of chloroprednisone.
