= Hydrocortisone hemisuccinate =

Chemical compound

Clinical data
- Other names: Hydrocortisone hydrogen succinate; Hydrocortisone succinate; Cortisol 21-hemisuccinate; 11β,17α,21-Trihydroxypregn-4-ene-3,20-dione 21-hemisuccinate
- Drug class: Corticosteroid; Glucocorticoid

Identifiers
- IUPAC name: 4-[2-[(8S,9S,10R,11S,13S,14S,17R)-11,17-Dihydroxy-10,13-dimethyl-3-oxo-2,6,7,8,9,11,12,14,15,16-decahydro-1H-cyclopenta[a]phenanthren-17-yl]-2-oxoethoxy]-4-oxobutanoic acid
- CAS Number: 2203-97-6 110-15-6 (succinic acid)
- PubChem CID: 16623
- DrugBank: DB14545
- ChemSpider: 15760
- UNII: IHV1VP592V
- KEGG: D01442
- ChEBI: CHEBI:31677
- ChEMBL: ChEMBL977
- CompTox Dashboard (EPA): DTXSID40872905
- ECHA InfoCard: 100.016.921

Chemical and physical data
- Formula: C_{25}H_{34}O_{8}
- Molar mass: 462.539 g·mol^{−1}
- 3D model (JSmol): Interactive image
- SMILES: C[C@]12CCC(=O)C=C1CC[C@@H]3[C@@H]2[C@H](C[C@]4([C@H]3CC[C@@]4(C(=O)COC(=O)CCC(=O)O)O)C)O
- InChI: InChI=1S/C25H34O8/c1-23-9-7-15(26)11-14(23)3-4-16-17-8-10-25(32,24(17,2)12-18(27)22(16)23)19(28)13-33-21(31)6-5-20(29)30/h11,16-18,22,27,32H,3-10,12-13H2,1-2H3,(H,29,30)/t16-,17-,18-,22+,23-,24-,25-/m0/s1; Key:VWQWXZAWFPZJDA-CGVGKPPMSA-N

Hydrocortisone hemisuccinate (USAN), also known as hydrocortisone hydrogen succinate (BANM) or simply hydrocortisone succinate and sold under the brand name Solu-Cortel among many others, is a synthetic glucocorticoid corticosteroid and a corticosteroid ester which is used for antiinflammatory and antiallergic indications.

== See also ==
- List of corticosteroid esters
