= Clobetasone butyrate =

Chemical compound

Clinical data
- Drug class: Corticosteroid; Glucocorticoid

Identifiers
- IUPAC name: (16β)-21-Chloro-9-fluoro-16-methyl-3,11,20-trioxopregna-1,4-dien-17-yl butyrate
- CAS Number: 25122-57-0
- ChemSpider: 64481
- UNII: 8U0H6XI6EO
- CompTox Dashboard (EPA): DTXSID3046823
- ECHA InfoCard: 100.042.381

Chemical and physical data
- Formula: C_{26}H_{32}ClFO_{5}
- Molar mass: 478.99 g·mol^{−1}
- 3D model (JSmol): Interactive image
- SMILES: CCCC(=O)O[C@@]1([C@H](C[C@@H]2[C@@]1(CC(=O)[C@]3([C@H]2CCC4=CC(=O)C=C[C@@]43C)F)C)C)C(=O)CCl
- InChI: InChI=1S/C26H32ClFO5/c1-5-6-22(32)33-26(21(31)14-27)15(2)11-19-18-8-7-16-12-17(29)9-10-23(16,3)25(18,28)20(30)13-24(19,26)4/h9-10,12,15,18-19H,5-8,11,13-14H2,1-4H3/t15-,18-,19-,23-,24-,25-,26-/m0/s1; Key:FBRAWBYQGRLCEK-AVVSTMBFSA-N

Clobetasone butyrate is a synthetic glucocorticoid corticosteroid and a corticosteroid ester that is used in the treatment of skin disorders such as eczema and psoriasis.
