= Cortobenzolone =

Chemical compound

Clinical data
- Trade names: Tuplix
- Other names: Betamethasone salicylate; 9α-Fluoro-11β,16α,17α-trihydroxy-21-((2-hydroxybenzoyl)oxy)pregna-1,4-diene-3,20-dione
- Drug class: Corticosteroid; Glucocorticoid

Identifiers
- IUPAC name: [2-[(8S,10S,11S,13S,14S,16R,17S)-9-Fluoro-11,16,17-trihydroxy-10,13-dimethyl-3-oxo-6,7,8,11,12,14,15,16-octahydrocyclopenta[a]phenanthren-17-yl]-2-oxoethyl] 2-hydroxybenzoate
- CAS Number: 52619-32-6 65849-38-9
- PubChem CID: 191783
- ChemSpider: 166511
- CompTox Dashboard (EPA): DTXSID60984337

Chemical and physical data
- Formula: C_{28}H_{31}FO_{8}
- Molar mass: 514.546 g·mol^{−1}
- 3D model (JSmol): Interactive image
- SMILES: C[C@]12C[C@@H](C3([C@H]([C@@H]1C[C@H]([C@@]2(C(=O)COC(=O)C4=CC=CC=C4O)O)O)CCC5=CC(=O)C=C[C@@]53C)F)O
- InChI: InChI=1S/C28H31FO8/c1-25-10-9-16(30)11-15(25)7-8-18-19-12-21(32)28(36,26(19,2)13-22(33)27(18,25)29)23(34)14-37-24(35)17-5-3-4-6-20(17)31/h3-6,9-11,18-19,21-22,31-33,36H,7-8,12-14H2,1-2H3/t18-,19-,21+,22-,25-,26-,27?,28-/m0/s1; Key:FVUHHROTFPGTFL-OHKAWVANSA-N

Cortobenzolone (brand name Tuplix), also known as betamethasone salicylate, is a synthetic glucocorticoid corticosteroid and corticosteroid ester which is marketed in Spain.
