= Prednisolone tebutate =

Chemical compound

Clinical data
- Other names: Prednisolone 21-tert-butylacetate; Codelcortone TBA
- Drug class: Corticosteroid; Glucocorticoid

Identifiers
- IUPAC name: [2-[(8S,9S,10R,11S,13S,14S,17R)-11,17-Dihydroxy-10,13-dimethyl-3-oxo-7,8,9,11,12,14,15,16-octahydro-6H-cyclopenta[a]phenanthren-17-yl]-2-oxoethyl] 3,3-dimethylbutanoate
- CAS Number: 7681-14-3
- PubChem CID: 93055
- DrugBank: DB14632
- ChemSpider: 84007
- UNII: 1V7A1U282K
- KEGG: D00982
- ChEBI: CHEBI:8381
- ChEMBL: ChEMBL1200909
- CompTox Dashboard (EPA): DTXSID8023505
- ECHA InfoCard: 100.028.783

Chemical and physical data
- Formula: C_{27}H_{38}O_{6}
- Molar mass: 458.595 g·mol^{−1}
- 3D model (JSmol): Interactive image
- SMILES: C[C@]12C[C@@H]([C@H]3[C@H]([C@@H]1CC[C@@]2(C(=O)COC(=O)CC(C)(C)C)O)CCC4=CC(=O)C=C[C@]34C)O
- InChI: InChI=1S/C27H38O6/c1-24(2,3)14-22(31)33-15-21(30)27(32)11-9-19-18-7-6-16-12-17(28)8-10-25(16,4)23(18)20(29)13-26(19,27)5/h8,10,12,18-20,23,29,32H,6-7,9,11,13-15H2,1-5H3/t18-,19-,20-,23+,25-,26-,27-/m0/s1; Key:HUMXXHTVHHLNRO-KAJVQRHHSA-N

Prednisolone tebutate is a synthetic glucocorticoid corticosteroid and a corticosteroid ester.
