= Hydrocortisone cypionate =

Chemical compound

Clinical data
- Trade names: Cortef
- Drug class: Corticosteroid; Glucocorticoid

Identifiers
- IUPAC name: [2-[(8S,9S,10R,11S,13S,14S,17R)-11,17-Dihydroxy-10,13-dimethyl-3-oxo-2,6,7,8,9,11,12,14,15,16-decahydro-1H-cyclopenta[a]phenanthren-17-yl]-2-oxoethyl] 3-cyclopentylpropanoate
- CAS Number: 508-99-6
- PubChem CID: 223253
- DrugBank: DB14541
- UNII: 4XDY25L70B
- CompTox Dashboard (EPA): DTXSID90872930
- ECHA InfoCard: 100.007.356

Chemical and physical data
- Formula: C_{29}H_{42}O_{6}
- Molar mass: 486.649 g·mol^{−1}
- 3D model (JSmol): Interactive image
- SMILES: C[C@]12CCC(=O)C=C1CC[C@@H]3[C@@H]2[C@H](C[C@]4([C@H]3CC[C@@]4(C(=O)COC(=O)CCC5CCCC5)O)C)O
- InChI: InChI=1S/C29H42O6/c1-27-13-11-20(30)15-19(27)8-9-21-22-12-14-29(34,28(22,2)16-23(31)26(21)27)24(32)17-35-25(33)10-7-18-5-3-4-6-18/h15,18,21-23,26,31,34H,3-14,16-17H2,1-2H3/t21-,22-,23-,26+,27-,28-,29-/m0/s1; Key:DLVOSEUFIRPIRM-KAQKJVHQSA-N

Hydrocortisone cypionate, sold under the brand name Cortef, is a synthetic glucocorticoid corticosteroid and a corticosteroid ester.
