= Prednisolamate =

Chemical compound

Clinical data
- Trade names: Etaproctene (with lidocaine and tetryzoline)
- Other names: Prednisolone 21-diethylaminoacetate; 11β,17α,21-Trihydroxypregna-1,4-diene-3,20-dione 21-N,N-diethylglycine ester
- Drug class: Corticosteroid; Glucocorticoid

Identifiers
- IUPAC name: [2-[(8S,9S,10R,11S,13S,14S,17R)-11,17-Dihydroxy-10,13-dimethyl-3-oxo-7,8,9,11,12,14,15,16-octahydro-6H-cyclopenta[a]phenanthren-17-yl]-2-oxoethyl] 2-(diethylamino)acetate
- CAS Number: 5626-34-6 17140-01-1 (hydrochloride)
- PubChem CID: 20055007
- ChemSpider: 16735978
- UNII: W262JY01SG
- ChEBI: CHEBI:135763
- ChEMBL: ChEMBL2106961
- CompTox Dashboard (EPA): DTXSID701024014
- ECHA InfoCard: 100.024.605

Chemical and physical data
- Formula: C_{27}H_{39}NO_{6}
- Molar mass: 473.610 g·mol^{−1}
- 3D model (JSmol): Interactive image
- SMILES: CCN(CC)CC(=O)OCC(=O)[C@]1(CC[C@@H]2[C@@]1(C[C@@H]([C@H]3[C@H]2CCC4=CC(=O)C=C[C@]34C)O)C)O
- InChI: InChI=1S/C27H39NO6/c1-5-28(6-2)15-23(32)34-16-22(31)27(33)12-10-20-19-8-7-17-13-18(29)9-11-25(17,3)24(19)21(30)14-26(20,27)4/h9,11,13,19-21,24,30,33H,5-8,10,12,14-16H2,1-4H3/t19-,20-,21-,24+,25-,26-,27-/m0/s1; Key:ILZSJEITWDWIRX-FOMYWIRZSA-N

Prednisolamate, also known as prednisolone 21-diethylaminoacetate, is a synthetic corticosteroid. It is or was a component of Etaproctene, which contains lidocaine, prednisolamate hydrochloride, and tetryzoline.
