= Paramethasone acetate =

Chemical compound

Clinical data
- Other names: Monocortin
- Drug class: Corticosteroid; Glucocorticoid

Identifiers
- IUPAC name: 2-[(1S,2R,8S,10S,11S,13R,14R,15S,17S)-8-Fluoro-14,17-dihydroxy-2,13,15-trimethyl-5-oxotetracyclo[8.7.0.0^{2,7}.0^{11,15}]heptadeca-3,6-dien-14-yl]-2-oxoethyl acetate
- CAS Number: 1597-82-6
- PubChem CID: 443928
- DrugBank: DB01384
- ChemSpider: 391984
- UNII: 8X50N88ZDP
- KEGG: D01229
- ChEBI: CHEBI:31963
- ChEMBL: ChEMBL1200342
- CompTox Dashboard (EPA): DTXSID8023422
- ECHA InfoCard: 100.014.989

Chemical and physical data
- Formula: C_{24}H_{31}FO_{6}
- Molar mass: 434.504 g·mol^{−1}
- 3D model (JSmol): Interactive image
- SMILES: [H][C@@]1(C)C[C@@]2([H])[C@]3([H])C[C@]([H])(F)C4=CC(=O)C=C[C@]4(C)[C@@]3([H])[C@@]([H])(O)C[C@]2(C)[C@@]1(O)C(=O)COC(C)=O
- InChI: InChI=1S/C24H31FO6/c1-12-7-16-15-9-18(25)17-8-14(27)5-6-22(17,3)21(15)19(28)10-23(16,4)24(12,30)20(29)11-31-13(2)26/h5-6,8,12,15-16,18-19,21,28,30H,7,9-11H2,1-4H3/t12-,15+,16+,18+,19+,21-,22+,23+,24+/m1/s1; Key:HYRKAAMZBDSJFJ-LFDBJOOHSA-N

Paramethasone acetate is a synthetic glucocorticoid corticosteroid and a corticosteroid ester. It is the acetate ester of paramethasone.

== Chemistry ==
Paramethasone acetate is the acetate ester derivative of paramethasone, a fluorinated glucocorticoid corticosteroid. It has the molecular formula C24H31FO6 and a molecular weight of 434.5 g/mol.

== Pharmacology ==
Paramethasone acetate is a synthetic glucocorticoid corticosteroid and the acetate ester of paramethasone. Like other glucocorticoids, it exerts anti-inflammatory and immunosuppressive effects by binding to glucocorticoid receptors and regulating the expression of genes involved in inflammatory and immune responses.

== Names and identifiers ==
Paramethasone acetate has been marketed under the trade name Monocortin. The compound has the CAS Registry Number 1597-82-6 and is listed in several chemical and pharmaceutical databases, including PubChem, DrugBank, ChEBI, and KEGG.

== History ==
Paramethasone acetate was developed as a synthetic glucocorticoid corticosteroid during the expansion of corticosteroid drug research in the mid-twentieth century. The drug was marketed under trade names including Monocortin and Haldrone and was in clinical use by the early 1970s, when studies evaluating injectable formulations were published.

According to pharmaceutical reference databases, paramethasone acetate was originally developed by Eli Lilly and received approval in the United States in 1961.
