= Fluazacort =

Chemical compound

Clinical data
- Trade names: Azacortid
- Other names: L-6400; Fluazacort acetate; 9α-Fluoro-11β-hydroxy-2'-methyl-5'H-pregna-1,4-dieno[17α,16α-d]oxazole-3,20-dione 21-acetate; 9α-Fluoro-11β,21-dihydroxy-3,20-dioxopregna-1,4-dieno(17α,16α-d)-2-methyloxazoline 21-acetate
- Drug class: Corticosteroid; Glucocorticoid

Identifiers
- IUPAC name: 2-[(4aS,4bR,5S,6aS,6bS,9aR,10aS,10bS)-4b-Fluoro-5-hydroxy-4a,6a,8-trimethyl-2-oxo-2,4a,4b,5,6,6a,9a,10,10a,10b,11,12-dodecahydro-6bH-naphtho[2',1':4,5]indeno[1,2-d][1,3]oxazol-6b-yl]-2-oxoethyl acetate
- CAS Number: 19888-56-3
- PubChem CID: 10072906
- ChemSpider: 8248446
- UNII: Y37GZ3VFSS
- KEGG: D04198
- ChEBI: CHEBI:135743
- ChEMBL: ChEMBL2107273
- ECHA InfoCard: 100.039.440

Chemical and physical data
- Formula: C_{25}H_{30}FNO_{6}
- Molar mass: 459.514 g·mol^{−1}
- 3D model (JSmol): Interactive image
- SMILES: CC1=N[C@@]2([C@H](O1)C[C@@H]3[C@@]2(C[C@@H]([C@]4([C@H]3CCC5=CC(=O)C=C[C@@]54C)F)O)C)C(=O)COC(=O)C
- InChI: InChI=1S/C25H30FNO6/c1-13-27-25(20(31)12-32-14(2)28)21(33-13)10-18-17-6-5-15-9-16(29)7-8-22(15,3)24(17,26)19(30)11-23(18,25)4/h7-9,17-19,21,30H,5-6,10-12H2,1-4H3/t17-,18-,19-,21+,22-,23-,24-,25+/m0/s1; Key:BYZCJOHDXLROEC-RBWIMXSLSA-N

Fluazacort (brand name Azacortid) is a synthetic glucocorticoid corticosteroid which is marketed in Italy.
