= Desoxycorticosterone pivalate =

Chemical compound

Clinical data
- Trade names: Zycortal, Percorten V, Percorten M, Neocortin Depositum, Neocortodina Depositum, Neodin Depositum
- Other names: DOCP; Deoxycorticosterone pivalate; Desoxycortone pivalate; Deoxycortone pivalate; Percoten pivalate; Desoxycorticosterone trimethylacetate; Desoxycorticosterone trimethyl acetate; DCT; DOC-TMA; SC-46312; 21-Hydroxypregn-4-ene-3,20-dione pivalate; 21-(2,2-Dimethyl-1-oxopropoxy)pregn-4-ene-3,20-dione
- Routes of administration: Intramuscular injection
- Drug class: Corticosteroid; Mineralocorticoid
- ATC code: H02AA03 (WHO)

Identifiers
- IUPAC name: [2-[(8S,9S,10R,13S,14S,17S)-10,13-dimethyl-3-oxo-1,2,6,7,8,9,11,12,14,15,16,17-dodecahydrocyclopenta[a]phenanthren-17-yl]-2-oxoethyl] 2,2-dimethylpropanoate
- CAS Number: 808-48-0
- PubChem CID: 11876263
- DrugBank: DB01134
- ChemSpider: 10050591
- UNII: 16665T4A2X
- KEGG: D03699
- ChEBI: CHEBI:50782
- ChEMBL: ChEMBL1200592
- CompTox Dashboard (EPA): DTXSID8046036
- ECHA InfoCard: 100.011.242

Chemical and physical data
- Formula: C_{26}H_{38}O_{4}
- Molar mass: 414.586 g·mol^{−1}
- 3D model (JSmol): Interactive image
- SMILES: C[C@]12CC[C@H]3[C@H]([C@@H]1CC[C@@H]2C(=O)COC(=O)C(C)(C)C)CCC4=CC(=O)CC[C@]34C
- InChI: InChI=1S/C26H38O4/c1-24(2,3)23(29)30-15-22(28)21-9-8-19-18-7-6-16-14-17(27)10-12-25(16,4)20(18)11-13-26(19,21)5/h14,18-21H,6-13,15H2,1-5H3/t18-,19-,20-,21+,25-,26-/m0/s1; Key:VVOIQBFMTVCINR-WWMZEODYSA-N

Deoxycorticosterone pivalate (DOCP), also known as desoxycorticosterone trimethyl acetate (DOC-TMA or DCT) and sold under the brand names Zycortal, Percorten V, and Percorten M, is a mineralocorticoid medication and a mineralocorticoid ester. It is formulated as a microcrystalline aqueous suspension, is administered by intramuscular injection at regular intervals, and has a prolonged duration of action. The medication is the C21 pivalate (trimethylacetate) ester of 11-deoxycorticosterone.

== See also ==
- List of corticosteroid esters § Desoxycortone esters
