= Betamethasone benzoate =

Chemical compound

Clinical data
- Trade names: Bebate; Benisone
- Other names: Betamethasone 17-benzoate
- Drug class: Corticosteroid; Glucocorticoid

Identifiers
- IUPAC name: (11β,16β)-9-Fluoro-11,21-dihydroxy-16-methyl-3,20-dioxopregna-1,4-dien-17-yl benzoate
- CAS Number: 22298-29-9
- PubChem CID: 5282492
- ChemSpider: 4445633
- UNII: 877K0XW47A
- KEGG: D02286
- ChEBI: CHEBI:135798
- ChEMBL: ChEMBL1200376
- CompTox Dashboard (EPA): DTXSID2022670
- ECHA InfoCard: 100.040.801

Chemical and physical data
- Formula: C_{29}H_{33}FO_{6}
- Molar mass: 496.575 g·mol^{−1}
- 3D model (JSmol): Interactive image
- SMILES: C[C@H]1C[C@H]2[C@@H]3CCC4=CC(=O)C=C[C@@]4([C@]3([C@H](C[C@@]2([C@]1(C(=O)CO)OC(=O)c5ccccc5)C)O)F)C
- InChI: InChI=1S/C29H33FO6/c1-17-13-22-21-10-9-19-14-20(32)11-12-26(19,2)28(21,30)23(33)15-27(22,3)29(17,24(34)16-31)36-25(35)18-7-5-4-6-8-18/h4-8,11-12,14,17,21-23,31,33H,9-10,13,15-16H2,1-3H3/t17-,21-,22-,23-,26-,27-,28-,29-/m0/s1; Key:SOQJPQZCPBDOMF-YCUXZELOSA-N

Betamethasone benzoate is a synthetic glucocorticoid corticosteroid and a corticosteroid ester.
