= Hydrocortisone phosphate =

Chemical compound

Clinical data
- Drug class: Corticosteroid; Glucocorticoid

Identifiers
- IUPAC name: Disodium [2-[(8S,9S,10R,11S,13S,14S,17R)-11,17-Dihydroxy-10,13-dimethyl-3-oxo-2,6,7,8,9,11,12,14,15,16-decahydro-1H-cyclopenta[a]phenanthren-17-yl]-2-oxoethyl] phosphate
- CAS Number: 6000-74-4
- PubChem CID: 441406
- UNII: 0388G963HY
- CompTox Dashboard (EPA): DTXSID5046647
- ECHA InfoCard: 100.025.312

Chemical and physical data
- Formula: C_{21}H_{29}Na_{2}O_{8}P
- Molar mass: 486.408 g·mol^{−1}
- 3D model (JSmol): Interactive image
- SMILES: C[C@]12CCC(=O)C=C1CC[C@@H]3[C@@H]2[C@H](C[C@]4([C@H]3CC[C@@]4(C(=O)COP(=O)([O-])[O-])O)C)O.[Na+].[Na+]
- InChI: InChI=1S/C21H31O8P.2Na/c1-19-7-5-13(22)9-12(19)3-4-14-15-6-8-21(25,17(24)11-29-30(26,27)28)20(15,2)10-16(23)18(14)19;;/h9,14-16,18,23,25H,3-8,10-11H2,1-2H3,(H2,26,27,28);;/q;2*+1/p-2/t14-,15-,16-,18+,19-,20-,21-;;/m0../s1; Key:RYJIRNNXCHOUTQ-OJJGEMKLSA-L

Hydrocortisone sodium phosphate is the 21-O-phosphate ester prodrug of the glucocorticoid hydrocortisone. The phosphate group is esterified to hydrocortisone’s C21 hydroxyl group, improving aqueous solubility. Upon hydrolysis, it releases pharmacologically active hydrocortisone, which activates the glucocorticoid receptor to regulate gene expression and suppress inflammatory and immune responses.

It is chemically unstable, but can be stored in the absence of water or by certain neutral formulations.
