= Betamethasone acetate =

Chemical compound

Clinical data
- Drug class: Corticosteroid; Glucocorticoid

Identifiers
- IUPAC name: (11,16β)-9-Fluoro-11,17-dihydroxy-16-methyl-3,20-dioxopregna-1,4-dien-21-yl acetate
- CAS Number: 987-24-6
- ChemSpider: 392014
- UNII: TI05AO53L7
- CompTox Dashboard (EPA): DTXSID8022668
- ECHA InfoCard: 100.012.344

Chemical and physical data
- Formula: C_{24}H_{31}FO_{6}
- Molar mass: 434.504 g·mol^{−1}
- 3D model (JSmol): Interactive image
- SMILES: C[C@H]1C[C@H]2[C@@H]3CCC4=CC(=O)C=C[C@@]4([C@]3([C@H](C[C@@]2([C@]1(C(=O)COC(=O)C)O)C)O)F)C
- InChI: InChI=1S/C24H31FO6/c1-13-9-18-17-6-5-15-10-16(27)7-8-21(15,3)23(17,25)19(28)11-22(18,4)24(13,30)20(29)12-31-14(2)26/h7-8,10,13,17-19,28,30H,5-6,9,11-12H2,1-4H3/t13-,17-,18-,19-,21-,22-,23-,24-/m0/s1; Key:AKUJBENLRBOFTD-QZIXMDIESA-N

Betamethasone acetate is a synthetic glucocorticoid corticosteroid and a corticosteroid ester. It is the 21-acetate ester of betamethasone.

== See also ==
- Betamethasone phosphate
