= Methylprednisolone acetate =

Chemical compound

Clinical data
- Trade names: Depo-Medrol, Depo-Medrate, Depo-Medrone, others
- Other names: Depot methylprednisolone acetate; Methylprednisolone 21-acetate; 6α-Methylprednisolone 21-acetate; NSC-48985
- Routes of administration: Intramuscular injection
- Drug class: Corticosteroid; Glucocorticoid

Legal status
- Legal status: CA: ℞-only / OTC

Identifiers
- IUPAC name: [2-[(6S,10R,11S,13S,17R)-11,17-Dihydroxy-6,10,13-trimethyl-3-oxo-7,8,9,11,12,14,15,16-octahydro-6H-cyclopenta[a]phenanthren-17-yl]-2-oxoethyl] acetate
- CAS Number: 53-36-1
- PubChem CID: 45357932
- DrugBank: DBSALT001157
- ChemSpider: 5666
- UNII: 43502P7F0P
- KEGG: D00979
- ChEBI: CHEBI:6889
- ChEMBL: ChEMBL1364144
- CompTox Dashboard (EPA): DTXSID7023302
- ECHA InfoCard: 100.000.157

Chemical and physical data
- Formula: C_{24}H_{32}O_{6}
- Molar mass: 416.514 g·mol^{−1}
- 3D model (JSmol): Interactive image
- SMILES: C[C@H]1CC2C3CC[C@@]([C@]3(C[C@@H](C2[C@@]4(C1=CC(=O)C=C4)C)O)C)(C(=O)COC(=O)C)O
- InChI: InChI=1S/C24H32O6/c1-13-9-16-17-6-8-24(29,20(28)12-30-14(2)25)23(17,4)11-19(27)21(16)22(3)7-5-15(26)10-18(13)22/h5,7,10,13,16-17,19,21,27,29H,6,8-9,11-12H2,1-4H3/t13-,16?,17?,19-,21?,22-,23-,24-/m0/s1; Key:PLBHSZGDDKCEHR-UFBGDBPHSA-N

Methylprednisolone acetate, sold under the brand names Depo-Medrol among others, is a synthetic glucocorticoid corticosteroid and a corticosteroid ester—specifically the C21 acetate ester of methylprednisolone—which is used in clinical and veterinary medicine. It has been formulated as an aqueous suspension for intramuscular, intra-articular, soft tissue, and intralesional injection alone and in combination with lidocaine, a local anesthetic. Methylprednisolone acetate was previously suspended with polyethylene glycol but is no longer formulated with this excipient due to concerns about possible toxicity. Depo methylprednisolone acetate is a depot injection and is absorbed slowly with a duration of weeks to months with a single intramuscular injection.

== See also ==
- List of corticosteroid esters § Methylprednisolone esters
