= Prednimustine =

Chemical compound

Clinical data
- Trade names: Mostarina, Sterecyst
- Other names: EORTC 1502; Leo 1031; NSC 134087; Prednisolone 21-(4-(4-(bis(2-chloroethyl)-amino)phenyl)butanoate); 11β,17α-Dihydroxy-3,20-dioxopregna-1,4-dien-21-yl 4-{4-[bis(2-chloroethyl)amino]-phenyl}butanoate
- ATC code: L01AA08 (WHO)

Identifiers
- IUPAC name: [2-[(8S,9S,10R,11S,13S,14S,17R)-11,17-Dihydroxy-10,13-dimethyl-3-oxo-7,8,9,11,12,14,15,16-octahydro-6H-cyclopenta[a]phenanthren-17-yl]-2-oxoethyl] 4-[4-[bis(2-chloroethyl)amino]phenyl]butanoate
- CAS Number: 29069-24-7
- PubChem CID: 34457
- ChemSpider: 31708
- UNII: 9403SIO2S8
- KEGG: C19512
- CompTox Dashboard (EPA): DTXSID4021183
- ECHA InfoCard: 100.044.904

Chemical and physical data
- Formula: C_{35}H_{45}Cl_{2}NO_{6}
- Molar mass: 646.65 g·mol^{−1}
- 3D model (JSmol): Interactive image
- SMILES: C[C@]12C[C@@H]([C@H]3[C@H]([C@@H]1CC[C@@]2(C(=O)COC(=O)CCCc4ccc(cc4)N(CCCl)CCCl)O)CCC5=CC(=O)C=C[C@]35C)O
- InChI: InChI=1S/C35H45Cl2NO6/c1-33-14-12-26(39)20-24(33)8-11-27-28-13-15-35(43,34(28,2)21-29(40)32(27)33)30(41)22-44-31(42)5-3-4-23-6-9-25(10-7-23)38(18-16-36)19-17-37/h6-7,9-10,12,14,20,27-29,32,40,43H,3-5,8,11,13,15-19,21-22H2,1-2H3/t27-,28-,29-,32+,33-,34-,35-/m0/s1; Key:HFVNWDWLWUCIHC-GUPDPFMOSA-N

Prednimustine, sold under the brand names Mostarina and Sterecyst, is a medication which is used in chemotherapy in the treatment of leukemias and lymphomas. It is the ester formed from two other drugs, prednisolone and chlorambucil. Rarely, it has been associated with myoclonus.

== See also ==
- List of hormonal cytostatic antineoplastic agents
- List of corticosteroid esters
