= Dexamethasone acetate =

Chemical compound

Clinical data
- Drug class: Corticosteroid; Glucocorticoid

Identifiers
- IUPAC name: [2-[(9R,10S,11S,13S,16R,17R)-9-Fluoro-11,17-dihydroxy-10,13,16-trimethyl-3-oxo-6,7,8,11,12,14,15,16-octahydrocyclopenta[a]phenanthren-17-yl]-2-oxoethyl] acetate
- CAS Number: 1177-87-3
- PubChem CID: 236702
- DrugBank: DB14649
- ChemSpider: 206624
- UNII: K7V8P532WP
- KEGG: D07796
- ChEBI: CHEBI:4463
- ChEMBL: ChEMBL1530428
- CompTox Dashboard (EPA): DTXSID8022901
- ECHA InfoCard: 100.013.315

Chemical and physical data
- Formula: C_{24}H_{31}FO_{6}
- Molar mass: 434.504 g·mol^{−1}
- 3D model (JSmol): Interactive image
- SMILES: C[C@@H]1CC2C3CCC4=CC(=O)C=C[C@@]4([C@]3([C@H](C[C@@]2([C@]1(C(=O)COC(=O)C)O)C)O)F)C
- InChI: InChI=1S/C24H31FO6/c1-13-9-18-17-6-5-15-10-16(27)7-8-21(15,3)23(17,25)19(28)11-22(18,4)24(13,30)20(29)12-31-14(2)26/h7-8,10,13,17-19,28,30H,5-6,9,11-12H2,1-4H3/t13-,17?,18?,19+,21+,22+,23+,24+/m1/s1; Key:AKUJBENLRBOFTD-HIBZCRSPSA-N

Dexamethasone acetate is a synthetic glucocorticoid corticosteroid and a corticosteroid ester.

In China, 999 Group sells it under the brand name Pi Yan Ping (Chinese: 皮炎平).
