= Butixocort =

Chemical compound

Clinical data
- Other names: Tixocortol butyrate; Tixocortol 17-butyrate; 11β,17α-Dihydroxy-21-mercaptopregn-4-ene-3,20-dione 17-butyrate; JO-1717
- Drug class: Corticosteroid; Glucocorticoid

Identifiers
- IUPAC name: [(8S,9S,10R,11S,13S,14S,17R)-11-Hydroxy-10,13-dimethyl-3-oxo-17-(2-sulfanylacetyl)-2,6,7,8,9,11,12,14,15,16-decahydro-1H-cyclopenta[a]phenanthren-17-yl] butanoate
- CAS Number: 120815-74-9
- PubChem CID: 189904
- ChemSpider: 164931
- UNII: 5D0M4JI29K
- ChEMBL: ChEMBL2104187
- CompTox Dashboard (EPA): DTXSID701318350

Chemical and physical data
- Formula: C_{25}H_{36}O_{5}S
- Molar mass: 448.62 g·mol^{−1}
- 3D model (JSmol): Interactive image
- SMILES: CCCC(=O)O[C@@]1(CC[C@@H]2[C@@]1(C[C@@H]([C@H]3[C@H]2CCC4=CC(=O)CC[C@]34C)O)C)C(=O)CS
- InChI: InChI=1S/C25H36O5S/c1-4-5-21(29)30-25(20(28)14-31)11-9-18-17-7-6-15-12-16(26)8-10-23(15,2)22(17)19(27)13-24(18,25)3/h12,17-19,22,27,31H,4-11,13-14H2,1-3H3/t17-,18-,19-,22+,23-,24-,25-/m0/s1; Key:HOAKOHHSHOCDLI-TUFAYURCSA-N

Butixocort, also known as tixocortol butyrate, is a synthetic glucocorticoid corticosteroid.
