= Ciclometasone =

Chemical compound

Clinical data
- Trade names: Cycloderm, Telocort
- Other names: Cyclomethasone; RIB-222; 9α-Chloro-11β,17α,21-trihydroxy-16β-methylpregna-1,4-diene-3,20-dione 21-[4-[(acetylamino)methyl]cyclo- hexyl]carboxylate; 21-[[[4-[(Acetylamino)methyl]cyclo- hexyl]carbonyl]oxy]-9α-chloro-11β,17α-dihydroxy-16β-methylpregna-1,4-diene-3,20-dione
- Drug class: Corticosteroid; Glucocorticoid

Identifiers
- IUPAC name: [2-[(8S,9R,10S,11S,13S,14S,16S,17R)-9-Chloro-11,17-dihydroxy-10,13,16-trimethyl-3-oxo-6,7,8,11,12,14,15,16-octahydrocyclopenta[a]phenanthren-17-yl]-2-oxoethyl] 4-(acetamidomethyl)cyclohexane-1-carboxylate
- CAS Number: 67372-50-3
- PubChem CID: 20055293
- ChemSpider: 16736546
- UNII: 85H8W42FJ2

Chemical and physical data
- Formula: C_{32}H_{44}ClNO_{7}
- Molar mass: 590.15 g·mol^{−1}
- 3D model (JSmol): Interactive image
- SMILES: C[C@H]1C[C@H]2[C@@H]3CCC4=CC(=O)C=C[C@@]4([C@]3([C@H](C[C@@]2([C@]1(C(=O)COC(=O)C5CCC(CC5)CNC(=O)C)O)C)O)Cl)C
- InChI: InChI=1S/C32H44ClNO7/c1-18-13-25-24-10-9-22-14-23(36)11-12-29(22,3)31(24,33)26(37)15-30(25,4)32(18,40)27(38)17-41-28(39)21-7-5-20(6-8-21)16-34-19(2)35/h11-12,14,18,20-21,24-26,37,40H,5-10,13,15-17H2,1-4H3,(H,34,35)/t18-,20?,21?,24-,25-,26-,29-,30-,31-,32-/m0/s1; Key:UYVYDRXVNVNQEA-BJTOFBPUSA-N

Ciclometasone (brand names Cycloderm, Telocort) is a synthetic glucocorticoid corticosteroid which is marketed in Italy.
