= Fluperolone acetate =

Chemical compound

Clinical data
- Other names: 9α-Fluoro-11β,17α,21-trihydroxy-21-methylpregna-1,4-diene-3,20-dione 21-acetate
- ATC code: D07AB05 (WHO)

Identifiers
- IUPAC name: (2S)-1-[(1R,2S,10S,11S,14R,15S,17S)-1-fluoro-14,17-dihydroxy-2,15-dimethyl-5-oxotetracyclo[8.7.0.0^{2,7}.0^{11,15}]heptadeca-3,6-dien-14-yl]-1-oxopropan-2-yl acetate
- CAS Number: 2119-75-7
- PubChem CID: 66257
- ChemSpider: 59639
- UNII: DOL7Q9DPF9
- KEGG: D04225
- CompTox Dashboard (EPA): DTXSID50895064
- ECHA InfoCard: 100.016.662

Chemical and physical data
- Formula: C_{24}H_{31}FO_{6}
- Molar mass: 434.504 g·mol^{−1}
- 3D model (JSmol): Interactive image
- SMILES: C[C@@H](C(=O)[C@]1(CC[C@@H]2[C@@]1(C[C@@H]([C@]3([C@H]2CCC4=CC(=O)C=C[C@@]43C)F)O)C)O)OC(=O)C
- InChI: InChI=1S/C24H31FO6/c1-13(31-14(2)26)20(29)23(30)10-8-17-18-6-5-15-11-16(27)7-9-21(15,3)24(18,25)19(28)12-22(17,23)4/h7,9,11,13,17-19,28,30H,5-6,8,10,12H2,1-4H3/t13-,17-,18-,19-,21-,22-,23-,24-/m0/s1; Key:HHPZZKDXAFJLOH-QZIXMDIESA-N

Fluperolone acetate is a corticosteroid. It has been used topically.
