= Prednisolone sodium phosphate =

Chemical compound

Clinical data
- Other names: Phortisolone
- AHFS/Drugs.com: Monograph
- License data: US DailyMed: Prednisolone_sodium_phosphate
- Routes of administration: By mouth, eye drops
- Drug class: Corticosteroid; Glucocorticoid

Legal status
- Legal status: US: ℞-only

Identifiers
- IUPAC name: Disodium [2-[(8S,9S,10R,11S,13S,14S,17R)-11,17-dihydroxy-10,13-dimethyl-3-oxo-7,8,9,11,12,14,15,16-octahydro-6H-cyclopenta[a]phenanthren-17-yl]-2-oxoethyl] phosphate
- CAS Number: 125-02-0
- PubChem CID: 441409
- UNII: IV021NXA9J
- ChEBI: CHEBI:8379
- CompTox Dashboard (EPA): DTXSID2047480
- ECHA InfoCard: 100.004.294

Chemical and physical data
- Formula: C_{21}H_{29}Na_{2}O_{8}P
- Molar mass: 486.408 g·mol^{−1}
- 3D model (JSmol): Interactive image
- SMILES: C[C@]12C[C@@H]([C@H]3[C@H]([C@@H]1CC[C@@]2(C(=O)COP(=O)([O-])[O-])O)CCC4=CC(=O)C=C[C@]34C)O.[Na+].[Na+]
- InChI: InChI=1S/C21H29O8P.2Na/c1-19-7-5-13(22)9-12(19)3-4-14-15-6-8-21(25,17(24)11-29-30(26,27)28)20(15,2)10-16(23)18(14)19;;/h5,7,9,14-16,18,23,25H,3-4,6,8,10-11H2,1-2H3,(H2,26,27,28);;/q;2*+1/p-2/t14-,15-,16-,18+,19-,20-,21-;;/m0../s1; Key:VJZLQIPZNBPASX-OJJGEMKLSA-L

Prednisolone sodium phosphate is a synthetic glucocorticoid corticosteroid and a corticosteroid ester.
