= Fenoxazoline =

Chemical compound

Clinical data
- Trade names: Aturgyl, Nasofelin, Nebulicina
- AHFS/Drugs.com: International Drug Names
- Routes of administration: Topical (nasal solution)
- ATC code: R01AA12 (WHO)

Legal status
- Legal status: Rx-only (BR)

Identifiers
- IUPAC name: 2-[(2-propan-2-ylphenoxy)methyl]-4,5-dihydro-1H-imidazole
- CAS Number: 4846-91-7
- PubChem CID: 71899
- ChemSpider: 64911
- UNII: 97JJW1W1R3
- KEGG: D07372
- ChEMBL: ChEMBL14012
- CompTox Dashboard (EPA): DTXSID30197533
- ECHA InfoCard: 100.023.124

Chemical and physical data
- Formula: C_{13}H_{18}N_{2}O
- Molar mass: 218.300 g·mol^{−1}
- 3D model (JSmol): Interactive image
- SMILES: CC(C)C1=CC=CC=C1OCC2=NCCN2
- InChI: InChI=1S/C13H18N2O/c1-10(2)11-5-3-4-6-12(11)16-9-13-14-7-8-15-13/h3-6,10H,7-9H2,1-2H3,(H,14,15); Key:GFYSWQDCHLWRMQ-UHFFFAOYSA-N

Fenoxazoline (trade name Aturgyl in Brazil) is a nasal decongestant.

Fenmetozole has the precise same formula, albeit instead of an ortho-isopropyl group, 3',4'-dich was chosen instead.
