= List of corticosteroid cyclic ketals =

Triamcinolone acetonide

Triamcinolone

Comparison of a corticosteroid (bottom) and its cyclic ketal derivative (top).

This is a list of corticosteroid cyclic ketals, including cyclic ketals (cyclic acetals) of steroidal glucocorticoids and mineralocorticoids. They are almost all C16α,17α cyclic ketals of corticosteroids. One of the most widely used corticosteroid cyclic ketals is triamcinolone acetonide, which is the C16α,17α acetonide (cyclic ketone with acetone) of triamcinolone.

This list mostly does not include esters of corticosteroid cyclic ketals, which are listed here instead.

== Acetonides ==
Acetonides (cyclic ketals with acetone):

- Cicortonide
- Ciprocinonide (fluocinolone acetonide cyclopropylcarboxylate)
- Descinolone acetonide (desoxytriamcinolone acetonide)
- Desonide (desfluorotriamcinolone acetonide)
- Drocinonide
- Fluclorolone acetonide (flucloronide)
- Fludroxycortide (flurandrenolide, flurandrenolone)
- Flumoxonide
- Flunisolide
- Fluocinolone acetonide
- Fluocinonide (fluocinolone acetonide 21-acetate)
- Flupamesone (triamcinolone acetonide metembonate)
- Formocortal
- Halcinonide
- Procinonide (fluocinolone acetonide propionate)
- Tralonide
- Triamcinolone acetonide
- Triamcinolone benetonide (triamcinolone acetonide 21-(benzoyl-β-aminoisobutyrate))
- Triamcinolone furetonide (triamcinolone acetonide 21-(2-benzofurancarboxylate))
- Triamcinolone hexacetonide (triamcinolone acetonide 21-tebutate)
- Triclonide

== Others ==
=== Acetophenides ===
Acetophenides (cyclic ketals with acetophenone):

- Algestone acetophenide (dihydroxyprogesterone acetophenide)
- Amcinafide (triamcinolone acetophenide)

=== Acroleinides ===
Acroleinides (cyclic ketals with acrolein):

- Acrocinonide (triamcinolone acroleinide)

=== Aminobenzals ===
Aminobenzals (cyclic ketals with 4-dimethylaminobenzylidene):

- Triamcinolone aminobenzal benzamidoisobutyrate (TBI-PAB)

=== Cyclopentanonides ===
Cyclopentanonides (cyclic ketals with cyclopentanone):

- Amcinonide (triamcinolone acetate cyclopentanonide)

=== Pentanonides ===
Pentanonides (cyclic ketals with 3-pentanone)

- Amcinafal (triamcinolone pentanonide)

=== With butyraldehyde ===
Cyclic ketals with butyraldehyde:

- Budesonide
- Dexbudesonide
- Itrocinonide
- Rofleponide

== Miscellaneous ==
- Nicocortonide is a C14α,17α cyclic ketal with crotonaldehyde

== See also ==
- List of corticosteroids
- Steroid ester
- List of corticosteroid esters
