= List of drugs: Tr–Tri =

This multi-page article lists pharmaceutical drugs alphabetically by name. Many drugs have more than one name and, therefore, the same drug may be listed more than once. Brand names and generic names are differentiated by capitalizing brand names.

See also the list of the top 100 bestselling branded drugs, ranked by sales.

Abbreviations are used in the list as follows:

- INN = International nonproprietary name
- BAN = British Approved Name
- USAN = United States Adopted Name
- Two-letter codes for countries

Lists of drugs
1–9 | A | B | C | D | E | F | G | H | I | J | K | L | M | N | O | P | Q | R | S | T | U | V | W | X | Y | Z

Ta–Td | Te | Tf–Th | Ti | Tj–Tq | Tra–Tri | Trj–Tz

== tr ==
=== tra ===
==== trab-tram ====
- trabectedin (USAN)
- trabedersen (USAN)
- traboxopine (INN)
- tracazolate (INN)
- Tracleer (Actelion)
- Tracrium
- tradecamide (INN)
- tradipitant (USAN, INN)
- trafermin (INN)
- Trajenta (Eli Lilly/Boehringer)
- tralokinumab (INN)
- tralonide (INN)
- tramadol (INN)
- tramazoline (INN)
- trametinib (USAN, INN)
- tramiprosate (USAN)

==== tran-trav ====
- Trancopal
- Trandate
- trandolapril (INN)
- trandolaprilat (INN)
- tranexamic acid (INN)
- tranilast (INN)
- Tranmep
- Trans-Ver-Sal
- transcainide (INN)
- Transderm scop
- Transderm-Nitro
- transferrin aldifitox (USAN)
- Translarna
- trantelinium bromide (INN)
- Tranxene
- tranylcypromine (INN)
- trapencaine (INN)
- trapidil (INN)
- Trasicor
- Trastucip
- trastuzumab emtansine (INN)
- trastuzumab (INN)
- Trasylol
- Travamulsion
- Travase
- Travasol
- Travatan
- travoprost (INN)
- Trazimera

==== trax-traz ====
- traxanox (INN)
- trazitiline (INN)
- trazium esilate (INN)
- trazodone (INN)
- trazolopride (INN)

=== tre ===
==== treb-tres ====
- trebananib (USAN)
- trebenzomine (INN)
- trecadrine (INN)
- Trecator-Sc
- Trecondyv
- trecovirsen (INN)
- trefentanil (INN)
- tregalizumab (INN)
- Tregzi
- trelagliptin (USAN)
- trelanserin (USAN)
- trelnarizine (INN)
- treloxinate (INN)
- Trelstar
- tremacamra (INN)
- tremelimumab (USAN)
- Tremfya
- Tremin
- trenbolone (INN)
- Trendar
- trengestone (INN)
- trenizine (INN)
- Trental (Sanofi-Aventis) redirects to pentoxifylline
- treosulfan (USAN, INN)
- trepibutone (INN)
- trepipam (INN)
- trepirium iodide (INN)
- treprostinil (USAN, INN)
- treptilamine (INN)
- trequinsin (INN)
- tresperimus (INN)
- Trest. Redirects to Metixene.
- trestolone (INN)

==== tret-trex ====
- tretamine (INN)
- tretazicar (INN, USAN)
- trethinium tosilate (INN)
- trethocanic acid (INN)
- tretinoin tocoferil (INN)
- tretinoin (INN)
- tretoquinol (INN)
- Trexall

=== tri ===
- Tri-Chlor
- Tri-Immunol
- Tri-K
- Tri-Levlen
- Tri-Luma
- Tri-Nasal
- Tri-Norinyl
- Tri-Phen-Chlor
- Tri-Previfem
- Tri-Pseudo
- Tri-Sprintec
- Tri-Sudo
- Tri-Tannate
- Tri-Vi-Flor
- Tri-Vi-Sol

==== tria-trib ====
- Triacet
- triacetin (INN)
- Triacin-C
- Triacort
- Triad
- Triaderm
- triafungin (INN)
- Trialodine
- triamcinolone benetonide (INN)
- triamcinolone furetonide (INN)
- triamcinolone hexacetonide (INN)
- triamcinolone (INN)
- Triaminic-12
- triampyzine (INN)
- triamterene (INN)
- Trianal
- Triaprin
- Triatex
- Triavil
- Triazavirin
- triaziquone (INN)
- triazolam (INN)
- tribendilol (INN)
- tribenoside (INN)
- tribromsalan (INN)
- tribuzone (INN)

==== tric ====
- Trichlorex
- Trichlormas
- trichlormethiazide (INN)
- trichlormethine (INN)
- triciribine (INN)
- triclabendazole (INN)
- triclacetamol (INN)
- triclazate (INN)
- triclobisonium chloride (INN)
- triclocarban (INN)
- triclodazol (INN)
- triclofenol piperazine (INN)
- triclofos (INN)
- triclofylline (INN)
- triclonide (INN)
- Triclos
- triclosan (INN)
- Tricor
- Tricosal
- tricosactide (INN)
- tricyclamol chloride (INN)

==== trid-trik ====
- tridecatide (USAN)
- Triderm
- Tridesilon
- tridihexethyl iodide (INN)
- Tridil
- Tridione
- trientine (INN)
- trifenagrel (INN)
- trifezolac (INN)
- triflocin (INN)
- triflubazam (INN)
- triflumidate (INN)
- trifluomeprazine (INN)
- trifluoperazine (INN)
- trifluperidol (INN)
- triflupromazine (INN)
- trifluridine (INN)
- triflusal (INN)
- trifocon A (INN)
- trigevolol (INN)
- trihexyphenidyl (INN)
- TriHIBit
- Trikacide

==== tril ====
- Trilafon
- Trileptal
- triletide (INN)
- Trilisate
- Trilitron
- Trilocur
- Trilorale
- trilostane (INN)
- Trilyte

==== trim-trin ====
- Trimazide
- trimazosin (INN)
- Trimbow
- trimebutine (INN)
- trimecaine (INN)
- trimedoxime bromide (INN)
- trimegestone (INN)
- trimeperidine (INN)
- trimeprazine tartrate
- trimetamide (INN)
- trimetaphan camsilate (INN)
- trimetazidine (INN)
- Trimeth-Sulfa
- trimethadione (INN)
- trimethidinium methosulfate (INN)
- trimethobenzamide (INN)
- trimethoprim (INN)
- trimetozine (INN)
- trimetrexate (INN)
- trimexiline (INN)
- trimipramine (INN)
- trimoprostil (INN)
- Trimox
- trimoxamine (INN)
- Trimpex
- Trinalin
- Trinasal
- TriNessa

==== trio-triz ====
- Triostat
- trioxifene (INN)
- trioxysalen (INN)
- tripalmitin (INN)
- tripamide (INN)
- triparanol (INN)
- Tripedia
- Tripelennamine
- tripelennamine (INN)
- Triphasil
- Triphed
- triprolidine (INN)
- triptorelin (INN)
- Triquilar
- Trisenox
- Trisenox (Cell Therapeutic)
- Trisoralen
- Trisudex
- Tritec
- tritiozine (INN)
- tritoqualine (INN)
- Trivagizole 3
- Trivora
- trixolane (INN)
- Trizivir
- trizoxime (INN)
