= Eudesmic acid =

- Chemical structure of eudesmic acid

Names
- Preferred IUPAC name 3,4,5-Trimethoxybenzoic acid
- Other names Gallic acid trimethyl ether Tri-O-methylgallic acid

Identifiers
CAS Number	118-41-2
3D model (JSmol)	Interactive image
ChEBI	CHEBI:454991
ChemSpider	8054
ECHA InfoCard	100.003.863
PubChem CID	8357
UNII	V5C9H0SC9F
CompTox Dashboard (EPA)	DTXSID3059472
- InChI: InChI=1S/C10H12O5/c1-13-7-4-6(10(11)12)5-8(14-2)9(7)15-3/h4-5H,1-3H3,(H,11,12) Key: SJSOFNCYXJUNBT-UHFFFAOYSA-N; InChI=1/C10H12O5/c1-13-7-4-6(10(11)12)5-8(14-2)9(7)15-3/h4-5H,1-3H3,(H,11,12) Key: SJSOFNCYXJUNBT-UHFFFAOYAD
- SMILES: COC1=CC(=CC(=C1OC)OC)C(=O)O

Properties
Chemical formula	C_{10}H_{12}O_{5}
Molar mass	212.201 g·mol^{−1}
- Except where otherwise noted, data are given for materials in their standard state (at 25 °C [77 °F], 100 kPa). verify (what is ?) Infobox references

Eudesmic acid is an O-methylated trihydroxybenzoic acid.

== Natural Occurrence ==
It can be found in Eucalyptus spp.

== Synthesis ==
Eudesmic acid is most directly synthesized by reaction of gallic acid with dimethyl sulfate.

== Derivatives ==
1. Esterified with Deanol.
2. Trimebutine
3. Amoproxan
4. Bernzamide
5. 3,4,5-trimethoxy-N-(pyridin-4-yl)benzamide [31638-97-8].
6. Butobendine
7. Capobenic acid
8. Dilazep
9. Ecipramidil
10. Fepromide
11. Hexobendine
12. Mepramidil (Diphenamilate)
13. TMB-8 [57818-92-5]
14. Tricetamide (Trimeglamide)
15. Trimethobenzamide
16. Trimetozine
17. Tritiozine (ala trimetozine but thioamide).
18. Trocimine [14368-24-2]
19. Troxipide (Lefron)
20. Troxonium
21. Troxypyrrolium (Troxypyrrole, Trox)
22. Trimetamide.
23. Vinmegallate (RGH-4417)
24. Leonuramine and Leonurine.
25. Methoserpidine, Reserpine and Deserpidine.
