= Carbohydrate acetalisation =

In carbohydrate chemistry carbohydrate acetalisation is an organic reaction and a very effective means of providing a protecting group. The example below depicts the acetalisation reaction of D-ribose 1. With acetone or 2,2-dimethoxypropane as the acetalisation reagent the reaction is under thermodynamic reaction control and results in the pentose 2. The latter reagent in itself is an acetal and therefore the reaction is actually a cross-acetalisation.

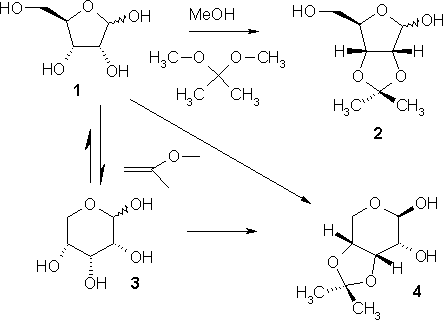

Kinetic reaction control results from 2-methoxypropene as the reagent. D-ribose in itself is a hemiacetal and in equilibrium with the pyranose 3. In aqueous solution ribose is 75% pyranose and 25% furanose and a different acetal 4 is formed.

Selective acetalization of carbohydrate and formation of acetals possessing atypical properties is achieved by using arylsulfonyl acetals. An example of arylsulfonyl acetals as carbohydrate-protective groups are phenylsulfonylethylidene acetals. These acetals are resistant to the acid hydrolysis and can be deprotected easily by classical reductive conditions.
