= Acetophenide =

Chemical structure of a simple acetophenide

In organic chemistry, acetophenide is a functional group which is composed of the cyclic ketal of a diol with acetophenone. In pharmaceutical chemistry, it is present in algestone acetophenide (dihydroxyprogesterone acetophenide) and amcinafide (triamcinolone acetophenide).

== See also ==
- Acetonide
- Acroleinide
- Aminobenzal
- Cyclopentanonide
- Pentanonide
