= C27H34F2O7 =

The molecular formula C_{27}H_{34}F_{2}O_{7} (molar mass: 508.55 g/mol, exact mass: 508.2273 u) may refer to:

- Difluprednate
- Procinonide
