= C5H12O2 =

The molecular formula C_{5}H_{12}O_{2} (molar mass: 104.15 g/mol, exact mass: 104.0837 u) may refer to:

- 2,2-Dimethoxypropane (DMP)
- Neopentyl glycol
- 1,5-Pentanediol
