= C25H34O6 =

The molecular formula C_{25}H_{34}O_{6} (molar mass: 430.53 g/mol, exact mass: 430.2355 u) may refer to:

- Budesonide (BUD)
- Dexbudesonide
- Ingenol mebutate
- YK-11
