= HDX =

HDX may refer to:

- HDX (Home Depot), in-house brand used by The Home Depot
- Fire HDX, Amazon Fire tablet computer
- Half-duplex, communication flowing in both directions, but not simultaneously
- Humanitarian Data Exchange, an open humanitarian data sharing platform managed by the United Nations Office for the Coordination of Humanitarian Affairs
- Hydrogen–deuterium exchange
- Lisofylline, an experimental anti-inflammatory drug
- Pro Tools HDX audio accelerator hardware
- Thomas Saf-T-Liner HDX, an American school bus
- Sky Sports HDX, a defunct Sky Sports HD channel brand
