= C24H29FO6 =

The molecular formula C_{24}H_{29}FO_{6} may refer to:

- Acrocinonide, a synthetic glucocorticoid corticosteroid
- Fluprednidene acetate, a moderately potent glucocorticoid used in form of a cream to treat skin inflammations
