= Adenosine reuptake inhibitor =

Drug class

Adenosine

An adenosine reuptake inhibitor (AdoRI) is a type of drug which acts as a reuptake inhibitor for the purine nucleoside and neurotransmitter adenosine by blocking the action of one or more of the equilibrative nucleoside transporters (ENTs). This in turn leads to increased extracellular concentrations of adenosine and therefore an increase in adenosinergic neurotransmission.

== List of AdoRIs ==
- Benzodiazepines
- Calcium channel blockers
- Carisoprodol
- Cilostazol
- Cyclobenzaprine
- Dilazep
- Dipyridamole
- Estradiol
- Ethanol
- Hexobendine
- Hydroxyzine
- Inosine
- KF24345
- Meprobamate
- Nitrobenzylthioguanosine
- Nitrobenzylthioinosine
- Papaverine
- Pentoxifylline
- Phenothiazines
- Phenytoin
- Progesterone
- Propentofylline
- Puromycin
- R75231
- RE 102 BS
- Soluflazine
- Toyocamycin
- Tracazolate
- Tricyclic antidepressants

== See also ==
- Adenosinergic
- Reuptake inhibitor
