= Acroleinide =

Chemical structure of a simple acroleinide

In organic chemistry, acroleinide is a functional group which is composed of a cyclic ketal of a diol with acrolein. In pharmaceutical chemistry, it is present in acrocinonide (triamcinolone acroleinide).

== See also ==
- Acetonide
- Acetophenide
- Aminobenzal
- Cyclopentanonide
- Pentanonide
