= Trest =

Trest may refer to:

- Třešť, a town in the Vysočina Region of the Czech Republic
- Trade name for Metixene
- Operation Trust, a Soviet deception operation also called Trest
