= Aminobenzal =

Functional group in organic chemistry

In organic chemistry, aminobenzal is a functional group which is composed of a cyclic ketal of a diol with 4-dimethylaminobenzylidene. It is seen in triamcinolone aminobenzal benzamidoisobutyrate.

== See also ==
- Acetonide
- Acetophenide
- Acroleinide
- Cyclopentanonide
- Pentanonide
