= C17H21NO2S =

The molecular formula C_{17}H_{21}NO_{2}S (molar mass: 303.42 g/mol; exact mass: 303.129301 u) may refer to:

- 2C-T-27
- 3-Quinuclidinyl thiochromane-4-carboxylate
