= C24H31FO5 =

The molecular formula C_{24}H_{31}FO_{5} corresponds to:

- Descinolone acetonide, a synthetic glucocorticoid corticosteroid that was never brought to market.
- Fluorometholone acetate, a synthetic glucocorticoid corticosteroid and corticosteroid ester, also functioning as a progestogen and progestogen ester.
