= 2-Methoxypropene =

Names
- Preferred IUPAC name 2-Methoxyprop-1-ene
- Other names Methyl isopropenyl ether Isopropenyl methyl ether

Identifiers
CAS Number	116-11-0
3D model (JSmol)	Interactive image
ChemSpider	7999
ECHA InfoCard	100.003.751
PubChem CID	8300
UNII	15WBG0JT6B
CompTox Dashboard (EPA)	DTXSID3051591
- InChI: InChI=1S/C4H8O/c1-4(2)5-3/h1H2,2-3H3 Key: YOWQWFMSQCOSBA-UHFFFAOYSA-N; InChI=1/C4H8O/c1-4(2)5-3/h1H2,2-3H3 Key: YOWQWFMSQCOSBA-UHFFFAOYAD
- SMILES: CC(=C)OC

Properties
Chemical formula	C_{4}H_{8}O
Molar mass	72.107 g·mol^{−1}
Appearance	Colorless liquid
Density	0.753 g/mL
Boiling point	34 to 36 °C (93 to 97 °F; 307 to 309 K)
- Except where otherwise noted, data are given for materials in their standard state (at 25 °C [77 °F], 100 kPa). Infobox references

2-Methoxypropene is an ether with the chemical formula C_{4}H_{8}O. It is a reagent used in organic synthesis to introduce a protecting group for alcohols, and the conversion diols to the acetonide group.

2-Methoxypropene can be prepared by the elimination of methanol from dimethoxypropane, or by the addition of methanol to propyne or allene.
