= Pentanonide =

Cyclic ketal of a diol with 3-pentanone

In organic chemistry, pentanonide is a functional group which is composed of a cyclic ketal of a diol with 3-pentanone. It is seen in amcinafal (triamcinolone pentanonide).

== See also ==
- Acetonide
- Acetophenide
- Acroleinide
- Aminobenzal
- Cyclopentanonide
