= Propentofylline =

Chemical compound

Clinical data
- AHFS/Drugs.com: International Drug Names
- ATC code: N06BC02 (WHO) QC04AD90 (WHO)

Identifiers
- IUPAC name: 3-methyl-1-(5-oxohexyl)-7-propyl-3,7-dihydro-1H-purine-2,6-dione
- CAS Number: 55242-55-2
- PubChem CID: 4938
- ChemSpider: 4769
- UNII: 5RTA398U4H
- CompTox Dashboard (EPA): DTXSID4045189
- ECHA InfoCard: 100.133.568

Chemical and physical data
- Formula: C_{15}H_{22}N_{4}O_{3}
- Molar mass: 306.366 g·mol^{−1}
- 3D model (JSmol): Interactive image
- SMILES: CCCn1cnc2c1c(=O)n(c(=O)n2C)CCCCC(=O)C
- InChI: InChI=1S/C15H22N4O3/c1-4-8-18-10-16-13-12(18)14(21)19(15(22)17(13)3)9-6-5-7-11(2)20/h10H,4-9H2,1-3H3; Key:RBQOQRRFDPXAGN-UHFFFAOYSA-N

Propentofylline (HWA 285) is a xanthine derivative drug with purported neuroprotective effects.

== Pharmacology ==
It is a phosphodiesterase inhibitor, and also acts as an adenosine reuptake inhibitor.

== Uses ==
Propentofylline was studied as a possible treatment for Alzheimer's disease and multi-infarct dementia, and has been studied, to a lesser extent, as a possible adjunct in the treatment of ischemic stroke, due to its vasodilating properties.

Propentofylline is in use as a veterinary medicine in older dogs.

== See also ==
- Pentoxifylline
