= Azatadine =

Chemical compound

Clinical data
- Trade names: Optimine
- AHFS/Drugs.com: Micromedex Detailed Consumer Information
- ATC code: R06AX09 (WHO)

Identifiers
- IUPAC name: 11-(1-Methylpiperidin-4-ylidene)-6,11-dihydro-5H-benzo[5,6]cyclohepta[1,2-b]pyridine
- CAS Number: 3964-81-6
- PubChem CID: 19861
- IUPHAR/BPS: 7119
- DrugBank: DB00719
- ChemSpider: 18709
- UNII: 94Z39NID6C
- KEGG: D07482
- ChEBI: CHEBI:2946
- ChEMBL: ChEMBL946
- CompTox Dashboard (EPA): DTXSID6022636

Chemical and physical data
- Formula: C_{20}H_{22}N_{2}
- Molar mass: 290.410 g·mol^{−1}
- 3D model (JSmol): Interactive image
- SMILES: n4c3\C(=C1/CCN(C)CC1)c2ccccc2CCc3ccc4
- InChI: InChI=1S/C20H22N2/c1-22-13-10-16(11-14-22)19-18-7-3-2-5-15(18)8-9-17-6-4-12-21-20(17)19/h2-7,12H,8-11,13-14H2,1H3; Key:SEBMTIQKRHYNIT-UHFFFAOYSA-N

Azatadine (Optimine) is a first-generation antihistamine and anticholinergic drug that was synthesized in 1963 by Schering-Plough, a former American pharmaceutical company. It is a nitrogen analog of cyproheptadine.

It was patented in 1967. It has been succeeded by both loratadine and desloratadine. and marketing approvals have been widely withdrawn.

== Pharmacology ==
Azatadine exhibits potent antihistamine, anticholinergic, antiserotonin, and antianaphylactic properties. Its anticholinergic potency is one-third that of atropine and equivalent to that of promethazine and cyproheptadine. Azatadine is among the more potent antianaphylactic agents.

Azatadine is a first-generation antihistamine.

== Field of application ==
The medicinal form of azatadine is the salt of maleic acid, azatadine maleate. It is described as an effective treatment for acute and chronic allergic rhinitis, vasomotor rhinitis, urticaria, and certain forms of atopic and contact dermatitis. At the maximum recommended therapeutic dose of 4 mg per day, the drug markedly reduced the severity of perennial allergic rhinitis in most patients (80%) over a 7-day period and significantly decreased swelling in histamine provocation and allergen tests. It was generally well tolerated. Drowsiness was reported by 40% of patients.

== Mechanism of action ==
Antihistamines such as azatadine compete with histamine for the histamine H1 receptor on plasma cell. This antagonism counteracts the pharmacological effects of histamine mediated through H_{1} receptor activation, thereby reducing the intensity of allergic reactions and the tissue damage associated with histamine release. In addition, azatadine has been shown to downregulate leukotrienes as part of the immediate allergic response.

== Synthesis ==
The multi-step synthesis has been described in the literature.

== See also ==
- Azatadine/pseudoephedrine
