= Cyclopentanonide =

Class of chemical compounds

In organic chemistry, cyclopentanonide is a functional group which is composed of a cyclic ketal of a diol with cyclopentanone. It is seen in amcinonide (triamcinolone acetate cyclopentanonide).

== See also ==
- Acetonide
- Acetophenide
- Acroleinide
- Aminobenzal
- Pentanonide
