= Solketal =

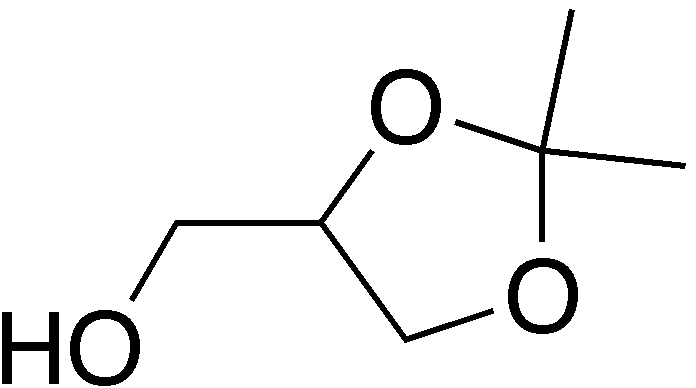

Names
- Preferred IUPAC name (2,2-Dimethyl-1,3-dioxolan-4-yl)methanol
- Other names Isopropylidene glycerol

Identifiers
CAS Number	100-79-8 Racemic; 14347-78-5 R enantiomer; 22323-82-6 S enantiomer
3D model (JSmol)	Interactive image
ChemSpider	7247
ECHA InfoCard	100.002.626
PubChem CID	7528
UNII	3XK098O8ZW
CompTox Dashboard (EPA)	DTXSID9021845
- InChI: InChI=1S/C6H12O3/c1-6(2)8-4-5(3-7)9-6/h5,7H,3-4H2,1-2H3 Key: RNVYQYLELCKWAN-UHFFFAOYSA-N; InChI=1/C6H12O3/c1-6(2)8-4-5(3-7)9-6/h5,7H,3-4H2,1-2H3 Key: RNVYQYLELCKWAN-UHFFFAOYAB
- SMILES: OCC1COC(C)(C)O1

Properties
Chemical formula	C_{6}H_{12}O_{3}
Molar mass	132.159 g·mol^{−1}
Appearance	clear colorless liquid
Density	1.063 g/mL at 25 °C
Boiling point	188 to 189 °C (370 to 372 °F; 461 to 462 K)
Solubility in water	Miscible
Solubility	Miscible in most organic solvents (alcohols, ethers, hydrocarbons)

Hazards
Flash point	80 °C (176 °F; 353 K)
- Except where otherwise noted, data are given for materials in their standard state (at 25 °C [77 °F], 100 kPa). verify (what is ?) Infobox references

Solketal is a protected form of glycerol with an isopropylidene acetal group joining two neighboring hydroxyl groups. Solketal contains a chiral center on the center carbon of the glycerol backbone, and so can be purchased as either the racemate or as one of the two enantiomers. Solketal has been used extensively in the synthesis of mono-, di- and triglycerides by ester bond formation. The free hydroxyl group of solketal can be esterified with a carboxylic acid to form the protected monoglyceride. The isopropylene group can then be removed using an acid catalyst in aqueous or alcoholic medium. The unprotected diol can then be esterified further to form either the di- or triglyceride.

Another route to specific di- or triglycerides involves converting the solketal to glycidol (2,3-epoxy-1-propanol) and esterifying this with one fatty acid before opening the epoxy by heating in the presence of a second fatty acid and a catalyst. This second fatty acid is put on the third carbon atom, and then a third fatty acid can be added to the second carbon atom.
