= Ampyzine =

Chemical compound

Clinical data
- Other names: Dimethylaminopyrazine; W-3580B; W3580-B; W-3580-B; W3580B
- ATC code: none

Identifiers
- IUPAC name: N,N-Dimethylpyrazin-2-amine
- CAS Number: 5214-29-9
- PubChem CID: 199885
- ChemSpider: 21955
- UNII: 630GTK993N
- ChEMBL: ChEMBL2110770
- CompTox Dashboard (EPA): DTXSID70200136

Chemical and physical data
- Formula: C_{6}H_{9}N_{3}
- Molar mass: 123.159 g·mol^{−1}
- 3D model (JSmol): Interactive image
- SMILES: n1ccnc(N(C)C)c1
- InChI: InChI=1S/C6H9N3/c1-9(2)6-5-7-3-4-8-6/h3-5H,1-2H3; Key:UUINNXPPLPDRQX-UHFFFAOYSA-N

Ampyzine (INN), also known as dimethylaminopyrazine or as ampyzine sulfate (USAN) in the case of the sulfate salt (developmental code name W-3580B), is a drug described as a "central stimulant" or "CNS stimulant" and "euphoriant". It is said to be a monoamine oxidase inhibitor (MAOI). Ampyzine was first described in the scientific literature by 1960.

An analogue of ampyzine is triampyzine (3,5,6-trimethylampyzine; developmental code name W-3976B). This drug is described as an anticholinergic and antisecretory agent.

== Synthesis ==

The classical method for synthesizing 2-aminopyrazines is illustrated by the synthesis of ampyzine. The condensation reaction between glyoxal and 2-aminomalonamide forms the pyrazine derivative (1). Acid-catalysed hydrolysis of the amide and decarboxylation gives 2-hydroxypyrazine (3). Halogenation with phosphorus pentachloride produces 2-chloropyrazine (4) which reacts with dimethylamine to yield ampyzine.
