= Trihydroxybenzoic acid =

Chemical structure of phloroglucinol carboxylic acid

Trihydroxybenzoic acid may refer to the following phenolic acids:

- Gallic acid (3,4,5-trihydroxybenzoic acid)
- Phloroglucinol carboxylic acid (2,4,6-trihydroxybenzoic acid)

O-methylated trihydroxybenzoic acids are:

- Eudesmic acid
- Syringic acid

Glycosides:

- Theogallin
