= Phloroglucinol carboxylic acid =

- Chemical structure of phloroglucinol carboxylic acid

Names
- Preferred IUPAC name 2,4,6-Trihydroxybenzoic acid
- Other names PGCA; Phloroglucinic acid

Identifiers
CAS Number	83-30-7
3D model (JSmol)	Interactive image
ChEBI	CHEBI:165217
ChemSpider	59891
ECHA InfoCard	100.001.334
PubChem CID	66520
UNII	3NC0UQ5EMR
CompTox Dashboard (EPA)	DTXSID1058890
- InChI: InChI=1S/C7H6O5/c8-3-1-4(9)6(7(11)12)5(10)2-3/h1-2,8-10H,(H,11,12) Key: IBHWREHFNDMRPR-UHFFFAOYSA-N; InChI=1/C7H6O5/c8-3-1-4(9)6(7(11)12)5(10)2-3/h1-2,8-10H,(H,11,12) Key: IBHWREHFNDMRPR-UHFFFAOYAP
- SMILES: C1=C(C=C(C(=C1O)C(=O)O)O)O

Properties
Chemical formula	C_{7}H_{6}O_{5}
Molar mass	170.11954 g/mol
- Except where otherwise noted, data are given for materials in their standard state (at 25 °C [77 °F], 100 kPa). verify (what is ?) Infobox references

Phloroglucinol carboxylic acid, also called ‘Phloroglucinic acid’ or simply ‘PGCA’, is a trihydroxybenzoic acid, a type of phenolic acid. It can be encountered in nature where it is produced by plants or microorganisms. Structurally, the molecule can be perceived as Gallic acid in which the 2 hydroxy groups at positions 3 and 5 respectively on the benzene ring backbone have been moved “up” to positions 2 and 6, closely neighboring the carboxylic acid functional group. Salts and esters of PGCA (e.g. potassium salt or methyl ester) are known as Phloroglucinates.

It is produced by Pseudomonas fluorescens. It is a catechin degradation product excreted by the bacterium Acinetobacter calcoaceticus, a species of bacteria part of the human body normal flora, grown on catechin as sole source of carbon. It is also found in wine.
