= Flupamesone =

Chemical compound

Clinical data
- Trade names: Flutenal
- Other names: UR-105; Triamcinolone acetonide metembonate; 4,4'-Methylene-bis((9α-fluoro-11β,21-dihydroxy-16α,17α-isopropylidenedioxypregna-1,4-diene-3,20-dione)3-methoxy-2-naphthoate); 21,21'-[Methylenebis[(2-methoxy-1,3-naphthalenediyl)- carbonyloxy]]bis[9α-fluoro-11β-hydroxy-16α,17α-[(1-methylethylidene)- bis(oxy)]pregna-1,4-diene-3,20-dione
- Routes of administration: Topical
- Drug class: Corticosteroid; Glucocorticoid

Identifiers
- IUPAC name: Bis{2-[(4aS,4bR,5S,6aS,6bS,9aR,10aS,10bS)-4b-fluoro-5-hydroxy-4a,6a,8,8-tetramethyl-2-oxo-2,4a,4b,5,6,6a,9a,10,10a,10b,11,12-dodecahydro-6bH-naphtho[2',1':4,5]indeno[1,2-d][1,3]dioxol-6b-yl]-2-oxoethy l} 4,4'-methylenebis(3-methoxy-2-naphthoate)
- CAS Number: 55461-42-2
- PubChem CID: 10011641
- ChemSpider: 8187217
- UNII: 8Q5FK6P4BC
- CompTox Dashboard (EPA): DTXSID301098978
- ECHA InfoCard: 100.054.209

Chemical and physical data
- Formula: C_{73}H_{78}F_{2}O_{16}
- Molar mass: 1249.408 g·mol^{−1}
- 3D model (JSmol): Interactive image
- SMILES: C[C@]12C[C@@H]([C@]3([C@H]([C@@H]1C[C@@H]4[C@]2(OC(O4)(C)C)C(=O)COC(=O)C5=CC6=CC=CC=C6C(=C5OC)CC7=C(C(=CC8=CC=CC=C87)C(=O)OCC(=O)[C@@]91[C@@H](C[C@@H]2[C@@]9(C[C@@H]([C@]4([C@H]2CCC2=CC(=O)C=C[C@@]24C)F)O)C)OC(O1)(C)C)OC)CCC1=CC(=O)C=C[C@@]13C)F)O
- InChI: InChI=1S/C73H78F2O16/c1-64(2)88-58-32-52-50-21-19-40-29-42(76)23-25-66(40,5)70(50,74)54(78)34-68(52,7)72(58,90-64)56(80)36-86-62(82)48-27-38-15-11-13-17-44(38)46(60(48)84-9)31-47-45-18-14-12-16-39(45)28-49(61(47)85-10)63(83)87-37-57(81)73-59(89-65(3,4)91-73)33-53-51-22-20-41-30-43(77)24-26-67(41,6)71(51,75)55(79)35-69(53,73)8/h11-18,23-30,50-55,58-59,78-79H,19-22,31-37H2,1-10H3/t50-,51-,52-,53-,54-,55-,58+,59+,66-,67-,68-,69-,70-,71-,72+,73+/m0/s1; Key:BVCDTHYWRLBGTG-YIVOTWLUSA-N

Flupamesone (brand name Flutenal), also known as triamcinolone acetonide metembonate, is a synthetic glucocorticoid corticosteroid which is marketed in Spain. It is a dimer of a C21 ester of triamcinolone acetonide.
