= Azatadine/pseudoephedrine =

Combination drug

Combination of
- Azatadine: Antihistamine
- Pseudoephedrine: Decongestant

Clinical data
- Trade names: Trinalin

Identifiers
- CAS Number: 3978-86-7

Azatadine/pseudoephedrine (Trinalin) is an antihistamine and decongestant formulation. It is a combination drug containing azatadine maleate and pseudoephedrine sulfate.
