= Drocinonide =

Chemical compound

Clinical data
- Other names: 9α-Fluoro-11β,16α,17α,21-tetrahydroxy-5α-pregnane-3,20-dione cyclic 16,17-acetal with acetone; 9α-Fluoro-11β,21-dihydroxy-16α,17α-((1-methylethylidene)bis(oxy))-5α-pregnane-3,20-dione
- Drug class: Corticosteroid; Glucocorticoid

Identifiers
- IUPAC name: (4aS,4bR,5S,6aS,6bS,9aR,10aS,10bS,12aS)-4b-Fluoro-6b-glycoloyl-5-hydroxy-4a,6a,8,8-tetramethylhexadecahydro-2H-naphtho[2',1':4,5]indeno[1,2-d][1,3]dioxol-2-one
- CAS Number: 2355-59-1
- PubChem CID: 20055479
- ChemSpider: 16736952
- UNII: 6UJ1P9T59P
- KEGG: D03910
- ChEMBL: ChEMBL2104454
- CompTox Dashboard (EPA): DTXSID101043234
- ECHA InfoCard: 100.017.358

Chemical and physical data
- Formula: C_{24}H_{35}FO_{6}
- Molar mass: 438.536 g·mol^{−1}
- 3D model (JSmol): Interactive image
- SMILES: C[C@]12CCC(=O)C[C@@H]1CC[C@@H]3[C@@]2([C@H](C[C@]4([C@H]3C[C@@H]5[C@]4(OC(O5)(C)C)C(=O)CO)C)O)F
- InChI: InChI=1S/C24H35FO6/c1-20(2)30-19-10-16-15-6-5-13-9-14(27)7-8-21(13,3)23(15,25)17(28)11-22(16,4)24(19,31-20)18(29)12-26/h13,15-17,19,26,28H,5-12H2,1-4H3/t13-,15-,16-,17-,19+,21-,22-,23-,24+/m0/s1; Key:GZBONOYGBJSTHF-QLRNAMTQSA-N

Drocinonide is a synthetic glucocorticoid corticosteroid which was never marketed.
