= Triamcinolone acetonide =

Medicinal chemical compound, steroid

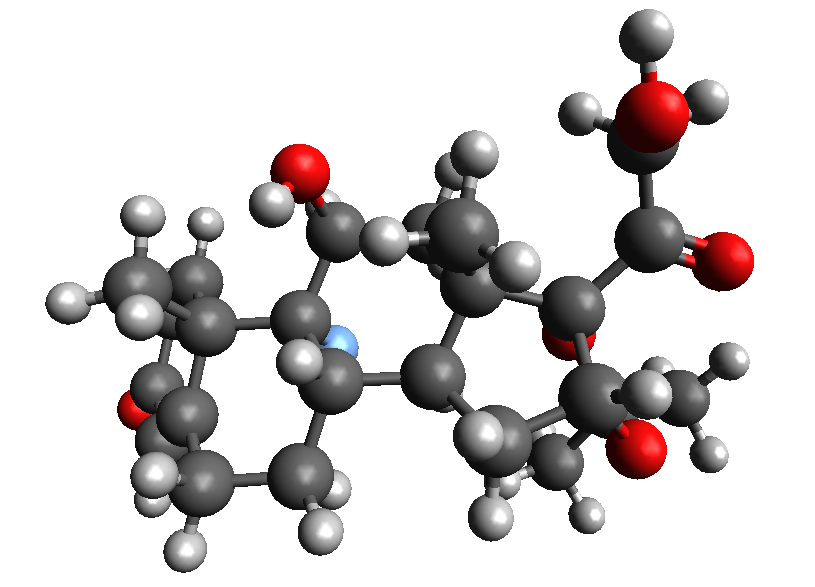

Clinical data
- Trade names: Kenalog, Nasacort, Xipere, others
- AHFS/Drugs.com: Monograph
- MedlinePlus: a601124
- License data: US DailyMed: Triamcinolone
- Pregnancy category: AU: B3/ A
- Routes of administration: Topical, joint injection, nasal
- ATC code: A01AC01 (WHO) D07AB09 (WHO), H02AB08 (WHO)

Legal status
- Legal status: AU: S4 (Prescription only) / S3 / S2; CA: ℞-only / OTC; UK: POM (Prescription only) / GSL; US: ℞-only / OTC; EU: Rx-only

Pharmacokinetic data
- Metabolism: Liver
- Excretion: Urine (75%) and feces (25%)

Identifiers
- IUPAC name: (4aS,4bR,5S,6aS,6bS,9aR,10aS,10bS)-4b-fluoro-6b-glycoloyl-5-hydroxy-4a,6a,8,8-tetramethyl-4a,4b,5,6,6a,6b,9a,10,10a,10b,11,12-dodecahydro-2H-naphtho[2',1':4,5]indeno[1,2-d][1,3]dioxol-2-one
- CAS Number: 76-25-5
- PubChem CID: 6436
- IUPHAR/BPS: 2867
- DrugBank: DBSALT000860
- ChemSpider: 6196
- UNII: F446C597KA
- KEGG: D00983
- ChEBI: CHEBI:71418
- ChEMBL: ChEMBL1504
- PDB ligand: 1TA (PDBe, RCSB PDB)
- CompTox Dashboard (EPA): DTXSID6021371
- ECHA InfoCard: 100.000.863

Chemical and physical data
- Formula: C_{24}H_{31}FO_{6}
- Molar mass: 434.504 g·mol^{−1}
- 3D model (JSmol): Interactive image
- Melting point: 290 to 294 °C (554 to 561 °F)
- SMILES: C[C@]12C[C@@H]([C@]3([C@H]([C@@H]1C[C@@H]4[C@]2(OC(O4)(C)C)C(=O)CO)CCC5=CC(=O)C=C[C@@]53C)F)O
- InChI: InChI=1S/C24H31FO6/c1-20(2)30-19-10-16-15-6-5-13-9-14(27)7-8-21(13,3)23(15,25)17(28)11-22(16,4)24(19,31-20)18(29)12-26/h7-9,15-17,19,26,28H,5-6,10-12H2,1-4H3/t15-,16-,17-,19+,21-,22-,23-,24+/m0/s1; Key:YNDXUCZADRHECN-JNQJZLCISA-N

Triamcinolone acetonide, sold under the brand name Kenalog among others, is a synthetic corticosteroid medication used topically to treat various skin conditions, to relieve the discomfort of mouth sores, and by injection into joints to treat various joint conditions. It is also injected into lesions to treat inflammation in some parts of the body, particularly the skin. In nasal spray form, it is used to treat allergic rhinitis. It is used for the treatment of macular edema associated with uveitis. It is a more potent derivative of triamcinolone, and is about eight times as potent as prednisone.

Most forms of triamcinolone acetonide are prescription drugs. In 2014, the U.S. Food and Drug Administration (FDA) made triamcinolone acetonide an over-the-counter drug in the United States in nasal spray form under the brand name Nasacort. It is available as a generic medication.

== Medical uses ==
Triamcinolone acetonide as an intra-articular injectable has been used to treat a variety of musculoskeletal conditions. When applied to the skin as a topical ointment, it is used to mitigate blistering from poison ivy, oak, and sumac. When combined with nystatin, it is used to treat skin infections with discomfort from fungus, though it should not be used on the eyes. It provides relatively immediate relief and is used before using oral prednisone. Oral and dental paste preparations are used for treating aphthous ulcers.

As an intravitreal injection, triamcinolone acetonide has been used to treat various eye diseases and has been found useful in reducing macular edema. Drug trials have found it to be as efficient as anti-VEGF drugs in eyes with artificial lenses over a two-year period. A systematic review did not find any evidence of any benefit in preventing vision loss in eyes treated with triamcinolone acetonide over placebo, for patients with age-related macular degeneration.

Triamcinolone acetonide is also administered via intralesional injection in the treatment of hypertrophic and keloid scars.

== Contraindications ==
Evidence suggests that usage of triamcinolone acetonide or other steroids to treat macular edema increases the risk of increasing intraocular pressure in patients.

== Pharmacology ==
=== Pharmacodynamics ===
Triamcinolone acetonide is a corticosteroid. It is specifically a glucocorticoid, or an agonist of the glucocorticoid receptor, that is about five times as potent as cortisol. It has very little mineralocorticoid effects. The affinities of triamcinolone acetonide for the androgen and estrogen receptors are both <0.1% (relative to testosterone and estradiol). However, triamcinolone acetonide has 15% of the affinity of progesterone for the progesterone receptor. In relation to this, triamcinolone acetonide can produce endocrine side effects like ovulation inhibition and menstrual irregularities.

== Chemistry ==
Triamcinolone acetonide, also known as 9α-fluoro-16α-hydroxyprednisolone 16α,17α-acetonide or as 9α-fluoro-11β,16α-17α,21-tetrahydroxypregna-1,4-diene-3,20-dione cyclic 16,17-acetal with acetone, is a synthetic halogenated cyclic ketal pregnane corticosteroid. It is the C16α,17α acetonide of triamcinolone.

== Veterinary use ==
Triamcinolone acetonide is also used in veterinary medicine as an ingredient in topical ointments and in topical sprays for control of pruritus in dogs.

It is used as a preinductor and/or inductor of birth in cows. It was also used in the horse racing industry, but it is now a banned substance if found in a horse's system on race day.
