= Fluocinolone/hydroquinone/tretinoin =

Combination drug

Combination of
- Fluocinolone acetonide: Corticosteroid
- Hydroquinone: Bleaching agent
- Tretinoin: Vitamin A derivative

Clinical data
- Trade names: Tri-Luma (US), Fumeida (CN), Refaquin (ID)
- Routes of administration: Topical (cream)

Legal status
- Legal status: US: ℞-only

Identifiers
- CAS Number: 940291-89-4
- ChemSpider: none
- KEGG: D12499

Fluocinolone acetonide/hydroquinone/tretinoin (trade name Tri-Luma) is a pharmaceutical drug combination used for the treatment of melasma (dark skin patches). It is marketed by Galderma. In China, this generic drug with the same ingredients is sold under the trade name Fulimei（孚立美 乳膏） and manufactured and marketed by Zhejiang Fonow Medicine Co.

== Medical uses ==
Fluocinolone acetonide (0.01%)/hydroquinone (4%)/tretinoin (0.05%) cream is indicated for the short-term (up to 8 weeks) treatment of moderate to severe melasma of the face in the presence of measures for sun avoidance, including the use of sunscreens. Tri-Luma is the only FDA-approved drug containing hydroquinone, a prescription product approved for the short-term treatment of dark spots associated with moderate-to-severe melasma of the face. FA+HQ+RA is effective in patients of all races/ethnicities and Fitzpatrick skin types.

== Side effects ==
Some patients may have very severe allergic reactions to Tri-Luma Cream due to the sulfites contained in the product. In some cases, these allergic reactions may result in severe asthma attacks, which can be life threatening. While using Tri-Luma Cream, the skin may develop mild-to-moderate redness, peeling, burning, dryness, or itching.

Tri-Luma Cream contains a corticosteroid medicine as one of its active components. The following side effects have been reported with application of corticosteroid medicines to the skin: itching, irritation, dryness, infection of the hair follicle, acne, changes in skin color, inflammation around the mouth, allergic skin reaction, skin infection, skin thinning, stretch marks and sweat problems.

In addition, Tri-Luma Cream contains a corticosteroid that may produce reversible effects on the adrenal gland called hypothalamic-pituitary-adrenal (HPA) axis suppression. Patients with conditions that may affect adrenal function, such as Addison’s disease, should inform their healthcare provider. Some patients using Tri-Luma Cream develop dark spots on their skin, tingling, increased skin sensitivity, rash, acne, skin redness caused by a condition called rosacea, skin bumps, blisters, or tiny red lines or blood vessels showing through the skin. Tri-Luma Cream may also cause a gradual blue-black darkening of your skin.

The most common side effects include:

- redness
- dryness
- peeling
- itching
- burning
- acne

== Active ingredients ==
Hydroquinone

Several hypotheses exist to explain the action of hydroquinone in skin lightening. It may interrupt one or more steps in thetyrosine-tyrosinase pathway of melanin synthesis, thus inhibiting the conversion of tyrosine to melanin. It compromises the formation of melanosomes and destroys the membranous structures of melanocytes, which results in their degradation. It has also been shown that hydroquinone affects fundamental aspects of cellular metabolism and that melanocytes are particularly vulnerable. Hydroquinone may be oxidized by tyrosinase to form toxic compounds. Even low concentrations can cause decreases in DNA and RNA synthesis in melanotic cells.

Tretinoin

Tretinoin (retinoic acid)causes dispersion of pigment granules in keratinocytes, interferes with pigment transfer, and accelerates epidermal transfer, thus causing pigment to be lost more rapidly. Tretinoin also accelerates epidermal turnover, shortening the "transit time" from the basal layer and accelerating pigment loss. Retinoic acid reduces epidermal melanin, possibly by decreasing the rate of transfer of melanosomes to keratinocytes, secondary to an increase in epidermal proliferation and tyrosinase inhibition and a resultant reduction in melano-genesis.

Corticosteroid

Corticosteroids have anti-metabolic effects on many cell systems. They are cytotoxic or cytostatic for the epidermis and decrease epidermal turnover.

=== History ===
Kligman formula consisting of 0.1% tretinoin, 5.0% hydroquinone, 0.1% dexamethasone, and hydrophilic ointment. The dermatologist gold-standard formula for treating hyperpigmentation is the Kligman formula, a prescription named after its inventor, dermatologist Albert Kligman. It was originally formulated in 1975 and has remained the most effective topical treatment formula for fading dark spots ever since.
