= Triampyzine =

Abandoned anticholinergic

Clinical data
- Other names: (Dimethylamino)trimethylpyrazine; W-3976B; W3976-B; W-3976-B; W3976B; 3,5,6-Trimethylampyzine

Identifiers
- IUPAC name: N,N,3,5,6-pentamethylpyrazin-2-amine
- CAS Number: 6503-95-3 7082-30-6 (sulfate)
- PubChem CID: 23484
- ChemSpider: 21956
- UNII: OPV4883241
- ChEMBL: ChEMBL2111165
- CompTox Dashboard (EPA): DTXSID90863888

Chemical and physical data
- Formula: C_{9}H_{15}N_{3}
- Molar mass: 165.240 g·mol^{−1}
- 3D model (JSmol): Interactive image
- SMILES: CC1=C(N=C(C(=N1)C)N(C)C)C
- InChI: InChI=1S/C9H15N3/c1-6-7(2)11-9(12(4)5)8(3)10-6/h1-5H3; Key:RKPVUWPGCFGDJO-UHFFFAOYSA-N

Triampyzine (INN), also known as triampyzine sulfate (USAN; developmental code name W-3976B) in the case of the sulfate salt, as (dimethylamino)trimethylpyrazine, or as 3,5,6-trimethylampyzine, is a drug described as an anticholinergic and antisecretory agent which was never marketed. It was first described in the literature by 1966. The drug is the 3,5,6-trimethylated derivative of ampyzine (W-3580B), which is also a drug and is, conversely, described as a "central stimulant".
