= Rofleponide =

Chemical compound

Clinical data
- Other names: 6α,9α-Difluoro-11β,16α,17α,21-tetrahydroxypregn-4-ene-3,20-dione, cyclic (R)-16,17-acetal with butyraldehyde; 16α,17α-[(1R)-butylidenebis(oxy)]-6α,9α-difluoro-11β,21-dihydroxypregn-4-ene-3,20-dione
- Drug class: Corticosteroid; Glucocorticoid

Identifiers
- IUPAC name: (4aS,4bR,5S,6aS,6bS,8R,9aR,10aS,10bS,12S)-4b,12-Difluoro-6b-glycoloyl-5-hydroxy-4a,6a-dimethyl-8-propyl-3,4,4a,4b,5,6,6a,6b,9a,10,10a,10b,11,12-tetradecahydro-2H-naphtho[2',1':4,5]indeno[1,2-d][1,3]dioxol-2-one
- CAS Number: 144459-70-1
- PubChem CID: 3055174
- ChemSpider: 2316734
- UNII: R9IQ7GVL3E
- CompTox Dashboard (EPA): DTXSID601318252

Chemical and physical data
- Formula: C_{25}H_{34}F_{2}O_{6}
- Molar mass: 468.538 g·mol^{−1}
- 3D model (JSmol): Interactive image
- SMILES: CCC[C@@H]1O[C@@H]2C[C@H]3[C@@H]4C[C@@H](C5=CC(=O)CC[C@@]5([C@]4([C@H](C[C@@]3([C@@]2(O1)C(=O)CO)C)O)F)C)F
- InChI: InChI=1S/C25H34F2O6/c1-4-5-21-32-20-10-14-15-9-17(26)16-8-13(29)6-7-22(16,2)24(15,27)18(30)11-23(14,3)25(20,33-21)19(31)12-28/h8,14-15,17-18,20-21,28,30H,4-7,9-12H2,1-3H3/t14-,15-,17-,18-,20+,21+,22-,23-,24-,25+/m0/s1; Key:IXTCZMJQGGONPY-XJAYAHQCSA-N

Rofleponide is a synthetic glucocorticoid corticosteroid which was never marketed.
