= Lisofylline =

Chemical compound

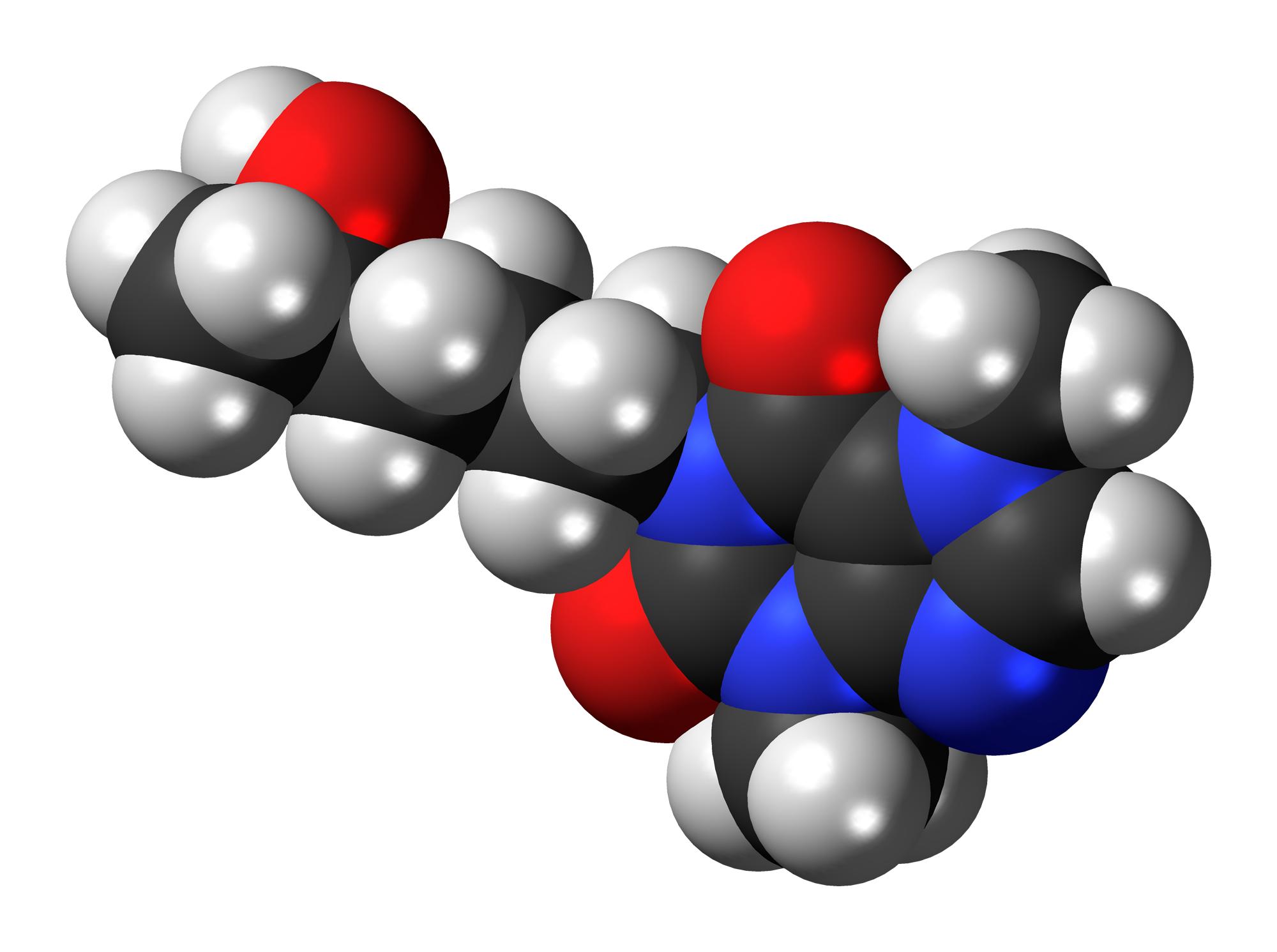

Clinical data
- Other names: 1-(5-Hydroxyhexyl)-3,7-dimethylxanthine (HDX)

Identifiers
- IUPAC name: 1-[(5R)-5-Hydroxyhexyl]-3,7-dimethyl-3,7-dihydro-1H-purine-2,6-dione
- CAS Number: 100324-81-0
- PubChem CID: 501254
- ChemSpider: 438549
- UNII: L1F2Q2X956
- ChEBI: CHEBI:143527
- ChEMBL: ChEMBL1411
- CompTox Dashboard (EPA): DTXSID7058709

Chemical and physical data
- Formula: C_{13}H_{20}N_{4}O_{3}
- Molar mass: 280.328 g·mol^{−1}
- 3D model (JSmol): Interactive image
- SMILES: O=C2N(c1ncn(c1C(=O)N2CCCC[C@H](O)C)C)C
- InChI: InChI=1S/C13H20N4O3/c1-9(18)6-4-5-7-17-12(19)10-11(14-8-15(10)2)16(3)13(17)20/h8-9,18H,4-7H2,1-3H3/t9-/m1/s1; Key:NSMXQKNUPPXBRG-SECBINFHSA-N

Lisofylline (LSF) is a synthetic small molecule with novel anti-inflammatory properties. LSF can effectively prevent type 1 diabetes in preclinical models and improves the function and viability of isolated or transplanted pancreatic islets. It is a metabolite of pentoxifylline.

As well, LSF improves cellular mitochondrial function and blocks interleukin-12 (IL-12) signaling and STAT-4 activation in target cells and tissues. IL-12 and STAT-4 activation are important pathways linked to inflammation and autoimmune damage to insulin producing cells. Therefore, LSF and related analogs could provide a new therapeutic approach to prevent or reverse type 1 diabetes. LSF also directly reduces glucose-induced changes in human kidney cells suggesting that LSF and analogs have the potential to treat the complications associated with diabetes.

== Synthesis ==
The R enantiomer of the pentoxifylline analogue in which the ketone has been reduced to an alcohol shows enhanced activity as an inhibitor of acetyl CoA over the parent drug.

Lisofylline synthesis: U.S. patent 5,567,704 NB

For analogs see:
