= Flumoxonide =

Chemical compound

Clinical data
- Other names: RS-40584; 6α,9α-Difluoro-11β,16α,17α-trihydroxy-3,20-dioxopregna-1,4-dien-21-al 21-(dimethyl acetal) cyclic 16,17-acetal with acetone; 6α,9α-Difluoro-11β-hydroxy-21,21-dimethoxy-16α,17α-((1-methylethylidene)- bis(oxy))pregna-1,4-diene-3,20-dione
- Drug class: Corticosteroid; Glucocorticoid

Identifiers
- IUPAC name: (4aS,4bR,5S,6aS,6bS,9aR,10aS,10bS,12S)-6b-(Dimethoxyacetyl)-4b,12-difluoro-5-hydroxy-4a,6a,8,8-tetramethyl-4a,4b,5,6,6a,6b,9a,10,10a,10b,11,12-dodecahydro-2H-naphtho[2',1':4,5]indeno[1,2-d][1,3]dioxol-2-one
- CAS Number: 60135-22-0
- PubChem CID: 20055353
- ChemSpider: 16736668
- UNII: K4U2KCO2OU
- KEGG: D04212
- ChEMBL: ChEMBL2104361
- CompTox Dashboard (EPA): DTXSID90208876
- ECHA InfoCard: 100.056.413

Chemical and physical data
- Formula: C_{26}H_{34}F_{2}O_{7}
- Molar mass: 496.548 g·mol^{−1}
- 3D model (JSmol): Interactive image
- SMILES: C[C@]12C[C@@H]([C@]3([C@H]([C@@H]1C[C@@H]4[C@]2(OC(O4)(C)C)C(=O)C(OC)OC)C[C@@H](C5=CC(=O)C=C[C@@]53C)F)F)O
- InChI: InChI=1S/C26H34F2O7/c1-22(2)34-19-11-14-15-10-17(27)16-9-13(29)7-8-23(16,3)25(15,28)18(30)12-24(14,4)26(19,35-22)20(31)21(32-5)33-6/h7-9,14-15,17-19,21,30H,10-12H2,1-6H3/t14-,15-,17-,18-,19+,23-,24-,25-,26-/m0/s1; Key:IUIYEHXOIMMQJY-NGXOUOCZSA-N

Flumoxonide (developmental code name RS-40584) is a synthetic glucocorticoid corticosteroid which was never marketed.
