= Ciprocinonide =

Chemical compound

Clinical data
- Other names: RS-2386; Fluocinolone acetonide 21-cyclopropylcarboxylate; 6α,9α-Difluoro-11β,16α,17α,21-tetrahydroxypregna-1,4-diene-3,20-dione cyclic 16,17-acetal with acetone 21-cyclopropanecarboxylate; 6α,9α-Difluoro-11β,21-dihydroxy-16α,17α-((1-methylethylidene)bis(oxy))pregna-1,4-diene-3,20-dione 21-cyclopropanecarboxylate
- Drug class: Corticosteroid; Glucocorticoid

Identifiers
- IUPAC name: 2-[(4aS,4bR,5S,6aS,6bS,9aR,10aS,10bS,12S)-4b,12-Difluoro-5-hydroxy-4a,6a,8,8-tetramethyl-2-oxo-2,4a,4b,5,6,6a,9a,10,10a,10b,11,12-dodecahydro-6bH-naphtho[2',1':4,5]indeno[1,2-d][1,3]dioxol-6b-yl]-2-oxoethyl cyclopropanecarboxylate
- CAS Number: 58524-83-7
- PubChem CID: 11954352
- DrugBank: DB18738
- ChemSpider: 10128647
- UNII: 8Y88CP83MK
- KEGG: D03520
- ChEMBL: ChEMBL2105934
- CompTox Dashboard (EPA): DTXSID601024166
- ECHA InfoCard: 100.055.715

Chemical and physical data
- Formula: C_{28}H_{34}F_{2}O_{7}
- Molar mass: 520.570 g·mol^{−1}
- 3D model (JSmol): Interactive image
- SMILES: C[C@]12C[C@@H]([C@]3([C@H]([C@@H]1C[C@@H]4[C@]2(OC(O4)(C)C)C(=O)COC(=O)C5CC5)C[C@@H](C6=CC(=O)C=C[C@@]63C)F)F)O
- InChI: InChI=1S/C28H34F2O7/c1-24(2)36-22-11-16-17-10-19(29)18-9-15(31)7-8-25(18,3)27(17,30)20(32)12-26(16,4)28(22,37-24)21(33)13-35-23(34)14-5-6-14/h7-9,14,16-17,19-20,22,32H,5-6,10-13H2,1-4H3/t16-,17-,19-,20-,22+,25-,26-,27-,28+/m0/s1; Key:TZBDXWBBMOEVPI-XBQQDWOSSA-N

Ciprocinonide (developmental code name RS-2386), also known as fluocinolone acetonide cyclopropylcarboxylate, is a synthetic glucocorticoid corticosteroid which was never marketed.
