= 3-Quinuclidinyl thiochromane-4-carboxylate =

Chemical compound

Identifiers
- IUPAC name: 1-azabicyclo[2.2.2]octan-3-yl 3,4-dihydro-2H-1-benzothiopyran-4-carboxylate
- CAS Number: 112605-36-4
- PubChem CID: 13953381
- ChemSpider: 129322734
- CompTox Dashboard (EPA): DTXSID901336926

Chemical and physical data
- Formula: C_{17}H_{21}NO_{2}S
- Molar mass: 303.42 g·mol^{−1}
- 3D model (JSmol): Interactive image
- SMILES: O=C(OC1CN2CCC1CC2)C1CCSc2ccccc21
- InChI: InChI=1S/C17H21NO2S/c19-17(20-15-11-18-8-5-12(15)6-9-18)14-7-10-21-16-4-2-1-3-13(14)16/h1-4,12,14-15H,5-11H2; Key:WKRAGTKCJCJQIR-UHFFFAOYSA-N

3-Quinuclidinyl thiochromane-4-carboxylate is a research compound which is the most potent muscarinic antagonist known. Tests in vitro showed it to have a binding affinity over 2100 times more potent than 3-quinuclidinyl benzilate (BZ) with an apparent association constant (K_{A}) of 2.47 picomolar (pM).

== See also ==
- CS-27349
- EA-3167
- Metixene
