= Hexobendine =

Chemical compound

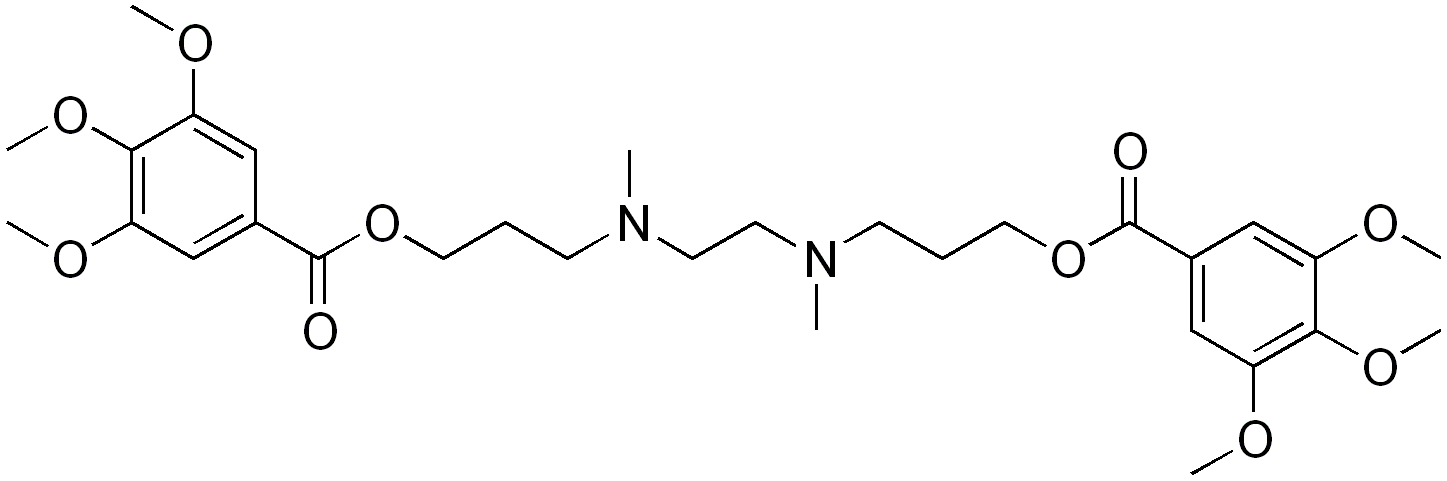

Clinical data
- ATC code: C01DX06 (WHO)

Identifiers
- IUPAC name: Ethane-1,2-diylbis[(methylimino)propane-3,1-diyl] bis(3,4,5-trimethoxybenzoate)
- CAS Number: 54-03-5
- PubChem CID: 5777
- ChemSpider: 5573
- UNII: B6X4SYR93B
- CompTox Dashboard (EPA): DTXSID20202302
- ECHA InfoCard: 100.000.173

Chemical and physical data
- Formula: C_{30}H_{44}N_{2}O_{10}
- Molar mass: 592.686 g·mol^{−1}
- 3D model (JSmol): Interactive image
- SMILES: COc1c(cc(cc1OC)C(=O)OCCCN(C)CCN(C)CCCOC(=O)c2cc(OC)c(OC)c(OC)c2)OC
- InChI: InChI=1S/C30H44N2O10/c1-31(11-9-15-41-29(33)21-17-23(35-3)27(39-7)24(18-21)36-4)13-14-32(2)12-10-16-42-30(34)22-19-25(37-5)28(40-8)26(20-22)38-6/h17-20H,9-16H2,1-8H3; Key:KRQAMFQCSAJCRH-UHFFFAOYSA-N

Hexobendine is a vasodilator that acts as an adenosine reuptake inhibitor.

== Synthesis ==
Hexobendine can be synthesized starting with a reaction between 3,4,5-trimethoxybenzoyl chloride (1) and 3-chloropropanol (2) to give the corresponding ester, 3-chloropropyl 3,4,5-trimethoxybenzoate (3). The last step involves the reaction between two molar equivalents of 3 with one molar equivalent of 1,2-dimethylethylenediamine (4) completing the synthesis of hexobendine (5).

Synthesis of hexobendine

== See also ==
- Dilazep
