= Tregalizumab =

Monoclonal antibody
- Type: Whole antibody
- Source: Humanized
- Target: CD4

Clinical data
- Other names: BT-061
- ATC code: none

Identifiers
- CAS Number: 1207446-68-1
- ChemSpider: none
- UNII: 43D26MK176

Tregalizumab is an immunomodulator. It is also known as BT-061. Tregalizumab binds to domain 2 of CD4, and activates Regulatory T cells (Tregs).
