= Itrocinonide =

Chemical compound

Clinical data
- Other names: D5159; 6α,9α-Difluoro-11β,16α,17α-trihydroxy-21-oxa-3-oxoandrosta-1,4-diene-17β-carboxylic acid, ester with ethyl (S)-1-hydroxyethyl carbonate, cyclic (R)-16,17-acetal with butyraldehyde; 6α,9α-Difluoro-11β,16α,17α-trihydroxy-21-oxapregna-1,4-diene-3,20-dione 21-(1-[(ethoxycarbonyl)oxy]ethyl), cyclic (R)-16,17-acetal with butyraldehyde
- Drug class: Corticosteroid; Glucocorticoid

Identifiers
- IUPAC name: (1S)-1-[(Ethoxycarbonyl)oxy]ethyl (4aS,4bR,5S,6aS,6bS,8R,9aR,10aS,10bS,12S)-4b,12-Difluoro-5-hydroxy-4a,6a-dimethyl-2-oxo-8-propyl-2,4a,4b,5,6,6a,9a,10,10a,10b,11,12-dodecahydro-6bH-naphtho[2',1':4,5] indeno[1,2-d][1,3]dioxole-6b-carboxylate
- CAS Number: 106033-96-9
- PubChem CID: 9959691
- ChemSpider: 8135300
- UNII: 2ZW8NEP6PQ
- ChEMBL: ChEMBL2105863
- CompTox Dashboard (EPA): DTXSID50883168

Chemical and physical data
- Formula: C_{29}H_{38}F_{2}O_{9}
- Molar mass: 568.611 g·mol^{−1}
- 3D model (JSmol): Interactive image
- SMILES: CCC[C@@H]1O[C@@H]2C[C@H]3[C@@H]4C[C@@H](C5=CC(=O)C=C[C@@]5([C@]4([C@H](C[C@@]3([C@@]2(O1)C(=O)O[C@H](C)OC(=O)OCC)C)O)F)C)F
- InChI: InChI=1S/C29H38F2O9/c1-6-8-23-39-22-13-17-18-12-20(30)19-11-16(32)9-10-26(19,4)28(18,31)21(33)14-27(17,5)29(22,40-23)24(34)37-15(3)38-25(35)36-7-2/h9-11,15,17-18,20-23,33H,6-8,12-14H2,1-5H3/t15-,17-,18-,20-,21-,22+,23+,26-,27-,28-,29-/m0/s1; Key:GCELVROFGZYBHY-JUVXQCODSA-N

Itrocinonide (developmental code name D5159) is a synthetic glucocorticoid corticosteroid which was never marketed.
