= Dilazep =

Chemical compound

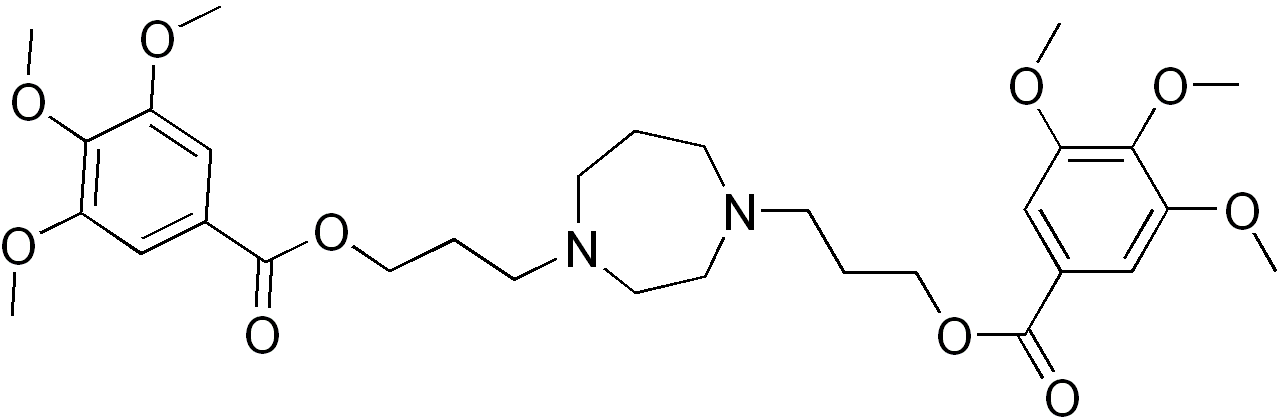

Clinical data
- Trade names: Comelian Kowa
- AHFS/Drugs.com: International Drug Names
- ATC code: C01DX10 (WHO)

Identifiers
- IUPAC name: 3-(4-{3-[(3,4,5-Trimethoxyphenyl)carbonyloxy]propyl}-1,4-diazepan-1-yl)propyl 3,4,5-trimethoxybenzoate
- CAS Number: 35898-87-4
- PubChem CID: 3074
- IUPHAR/BPS: 4717
- ChemSpider: 2965
- UNII: F8KLC2BD5Z
- KEGG: D07843
- ChEBI: CHEBI:92842
- ChEMBL: ChEMBL126075
- CompTox Dashboard (EPA): DTXSID9045425

Chemical and physical data
- Formula: C_{31}H_{44}N_{2}O_{10}
- Molar mass: 604.697 g·mol^{−1}
- 3D model (JSmol): Interactive image
- SMILES: O=C(OCCCN2CCCN(CCCOC(=O)c1cc(OC)c(OC)c(OC)c1)CC2)c3cc(OC)c(OC)c(OC)c3
- InChI: InChI=1S/C31H44N2O10/c1-36-24-18-22(19-25(37-2)28(24)40-5)30(34)42-16-8-12-32-10-7-11-33(15-14-32)13-9-17-43-31(35)23-20-26(38-3)29(41-6)27(21-23)39-4/h18-21H,7-17H2,1-6H3; Key:QVZCXCJXTMIDME-UHFFFAOYSA-N

Dilazep is a vasodilator that acts as an adenosine reuptake inhibitor.

It is used for the treatment of cardiopathy and renal disorders.

== Synthesis ==
The reaction of bis(3-hydroxypropyl)ethylene diamine (1) with 1-bromo-3-chloropropane (2) gives the homopiperazine derivative 3. Esterification by reaction with 3,4,5-trimethoxybenzoyl chloride (4) completes the synthesis of dilazep (5).

Synthesis of dilazep

== See also ==
- Hexobendine, a drug with similar chemical structure
