= Amcinafide =

Chemical compound

Clinical data
- Other names: Triamcinolone acetophenide; SQ-15112; (R)-9α-Fluoro-11β,16α,17α,21-tetrahydroxypregna-1,4-diene-3,20-dione cyclic 16,17-acetal with acetophenone; 9α-Fluoro-11β,21-dihydroxy-16α(R),17α-((1-phenylethylidene)- bis(oxy))pregna-1,4-diene-3,20-dione
- Drug class: Corticosteroid; Glucocorticoid

Identifiers
- IUPAC name: (4aS,4bR,5S,6aS,6bS,8R,9aR,10aS,10bS)-4b-Fluoro-6b-glycoloyl-5-hydroxy-4a,6a,8-trimethyl-8-phenyl-4a,4b,5,6,6a,6b,9a,10,10a,10b,11,12-dodecahydro-2H-naphtho[2',1':4,5]indeno[1,2-d][1,3]dioxol-2-one
- CAS Number: 7332-27-6
- PubChem CID: 11954283
- ChemSpider: 10128578
- UNII: F0Q1D55E29
- KEGG: D02887
- CompTox Dashboard (EPA): DTXSID90223549

Chemical and physical data
- Formula: C_{29}H_{33}FO_{6}
- Molar mass: 496.575 g·mol^{−1}
- 3D model (JSmol): Interactive image
- SMILES: C[C@]12C[C@@H]([C@]3([C@H]([C@@H]1C[C@@H]4[C@]2(O[C@](O4)(C)C5=CC=CC=C5)C(=O)CO)CCC6=CC(=O)C=C[C@@]63C)F)O
- InChI: InChI=1S/C29H33FO6/c1-25-12-11-19(32)13-18(25)9-10-20-21-14-24-29(23(34)16-31,26(21,2)15-22(33)28(20,25)30)36-27(3,35-24)17-7-5-4-6-8-17/h4-8,11-13,20-22,24,31,33H,9-10,14-16H2,1-3H3/t20-,21-,22-,24+,25-,26-,27+,28-,29+/m0/s1; Key:HCKFPALGXKOOBK-NRYMJLQJSA-N

Amcinafide (developmental code name SQ-15112), also known as triamcinolone acetophenide, is a synthetic glucocorticoid corticosteroid which was never marketed.
