= 2,2-Dimethoxypropane =

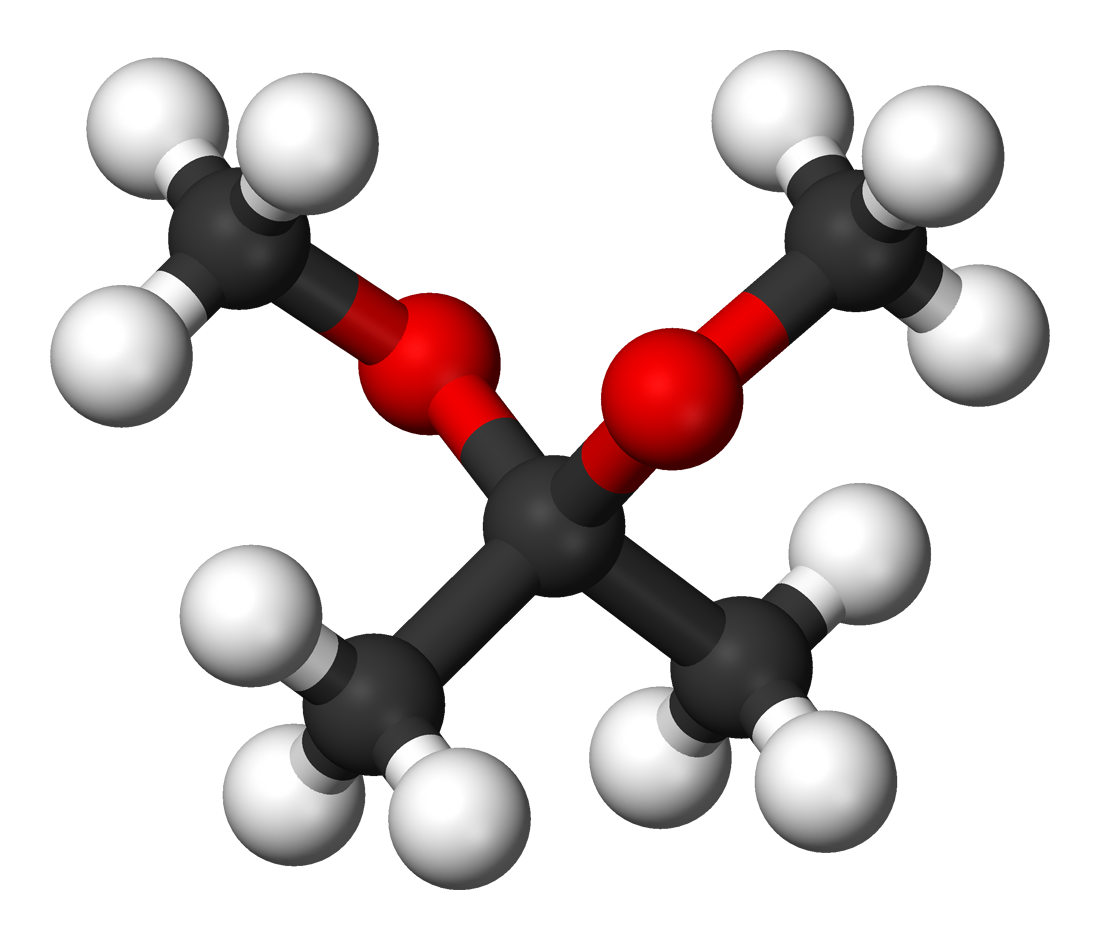
2,2-dimethoxypropane ball view

Names
- Preferred IUPAC name 2,2-Dimethoxypropane
- Other names acetone dimethyl acetal

Identifiers
CAS Number	77-76-9
3D model (JSmol)	Interactive image
ChEMBL	ChEMBL3184215
ChemSpider	21106033
ECHA InfoCard	100.000.961
EC Number	201-056-0
PubChem CID	6495
UNII	66P41R0030
CompTox Dashboard (EPA)	DTXSID7026441
- InChI: InChI=1S/C5H12O2/c1-5(2,6-3)7-4/h1-4H3 Key: HEWZVZIVELJPQZ-UHFFFAOYSA-N
- SMILES: CC(C)(OC)OC

Properties
Chemical formula	C_{5}H_{12}O_{2}
Molar mass	104.15 g/mol
Appearance	Colorless liquid
Density	0.85 g/cm^{3}
Melting point	−47 °C (−53 °F; 226 K)
Boiling point	83 °C (181 °F; 356 K)
Solubility in water	15 g/L (20 °C)

Hazards
- GHS labelling
Pictograms	(GHS02: Flammable) (GHS07: Exclamation mark)
Signal word	Danger
Hazard statements	H225, H315, H319, H335
Precautionary statements	P210, P233, P240, P241, P242, P243, P261, P264, P271, P280, P302+P352, P303+P361+P353, P304+P340, P305+P351+P338, P312, P321, P332+P313, P337+P313, P362, P370+P378, P403+P233, P403+P235, P405, P501
Safety data sheet (SDS)	External MSDS
- Except where otherwise noted, data are given for materials in their standard state (at 25 °C [77 °F], 100 kPa). verify (what is ?) Infobox references

2,2-Dimethoxypropane (DMP) is an organic compound with the formula (CH_{3})_{2}C(OCH_{3})_{2}. A colorless liquid, it is the product of the condensation of acetone and methanol. DMP is used as a water scavenger in water-sensitive reactions. Upon acid-catalyzed reaction, DMP reacts quantitatively with water to form acetone and methanol. This property can be used to accurately determine the amount of water in a sample, alternatively to the Karl Fischer method.

DMP is used to prepare acetonides from diols, where it is both a synthon for acetone and a scavenger for the water byproduct:

RCHOHCHOHCH_{2} + (CH_{3}O)_{2}C(CH_{3})_{2} → RCHCHCH_{2}O_{2}C(CH_{3})_{2} + 2 CH_{3}OH

It can also be used to prepare methyl esters from carboxylic acids, where it acts as a water scavenger and source of methanol:

RCOOH + CH_{3}OH → RCOOCH_{3} + H_{2}O
H_{2}O + (CH_{3})_{2}C(OCH_{3})_{2} —> 2CH_{3}OH + (CH_{3})_{2}C(O)

Dimethoxypropane is an intermediate for the synthesis of 2-methoxypropene.

In histology, DMP is used for the dehydration of animal tissue.
