= Acetonide =

Chemical compound

General structure of a 1,2-acetonide. The diol is shown in blue, the acetone part in red.

In organic chemistry, an acetonide is the functional group composed of the cyclic ketal of a diol with acetone. The more systematic name for this structure is an isopropylidene ketal. Acetonide is a common protecting group for 1,2- and 1,3-diols. The protecting group can be removed by hydrolysis of the ketal using dilute aqueous acid.

== Example ==
The acetonides of small di- and triols, as well as many sugars and sugar alcohols, are common. The hexaol mannitol reacts with 2,2-dimethoxypropane to give the bis-acetonide, which oxidizes to give the acetonide of glyceraldehyde:

(CHOHCHOHCH_{2}OH)_{2} + 2 (MeO)_{2}CMe_{2} → (CHOHCHCH_{2}O_{2}CMe_{2})_{2} + 4 MeOH
(CHOHCHOCH_{2}OCMe_{2})_{2} + [O] → 2 OCHCHCH_{2}O_{2}CMe_{2} + H_{2}O

An example of its use as a protecting group in a complex organic synthesis is the Nicolaou Taxol total synthesis. It is a common protecting group for sugars and sugar alcohols, a simple example being solketal.

The acetonides of corticosteroid are used in dermatology, because their increased lipophilicity leads to better penetration into the skin.

- Fluclorolone acetonide
- Fluocinolone acetonide
- Triamcinolone acetonide

== See also ==
- Acetophenide
- Acroleinide
- Aminobenzal
- Cyclopentanonide
- Pentanonide
