= Descinolone acetonide =

Chemical compound

Clinical data
- Other names: CL-27071; Desoxytriamcinolone acetonide; 21-Desoxytriamcinoline acetonide; 9α-Fluoro-11β,16α,17α-trihydroxypregna-1,4-diene-3,20-dione cyclic 16,17-acetal with acetone; 9α-Fluoro-11β-hydroxy-16α,17α-(isopropylidenedioxy)pregna-1,4-diene-3,20-dione
- Drug class: Corticosteroid; Glucocorticoid

Identifiers
- IUPAC name: (4aS,4bR,5S,6aS,6bS,9aR,10aS,10bS)-6b-Acetyl-4b-fluoro-5-hydroxy-4a,6a,8,8-tetramethyl-4a,4b,5,6,6a,6b,9a,10,10a,10b,11,12-dodecahydro-2H-naphtho[2',1':4,5]indeno[1,2-d][1,3]dioxol-2-one
- CAS Number: 2135-14-0
- PubChem CID: 11954034
- ChemSpider: 10128329
- UNII: ENR9Z582HW
- KEGG: D03691
- ChEBI: CHEBI:34672
- ChEMBL: ChEMBL2106177
- CompTox Dashboard (EPA): DTXSID60943909
- ECHA InfoCard: 100.016.699

Chemical and physical data
- Formula: C_{24}H_{31}FO_{5}
- Molar mass: 418.505 g·mol^{−1}
- 3D model (JSmol): Interactive image
- SMILES: CC(=O)[C@@]12[C@@H](C[C@@H]3[C@@]1(C[C@@H]([C@]4([C@H]3CCC5=CC(=O)C=C[C@@]54C)F)O)C)OC(O2)(C)C
- InChI: InChI=1S/C24H31FO5/c1-13(26)24-19(29-20(2,3)30-24)11-17-16-7-6-14-10-15(27)8-9-21(14,4)23(16,25)18(28)12-22(17,24)5/h8-10,16-19,28H,6-7,11-12H2,1-5H3/t16-,17-,18-,19+,21-,22-,23-,24+/m0/s1; Key:BSHYASCHOGHGHW-PIQRJGQMSA-N

Descinolone acetonide (developmental code name CL-27071), also known as desoxytriamcinolone acetonide, is a synthetic glucocorticoid corticosteroid which was never marketed.
