= Metixene =

Chemical compound

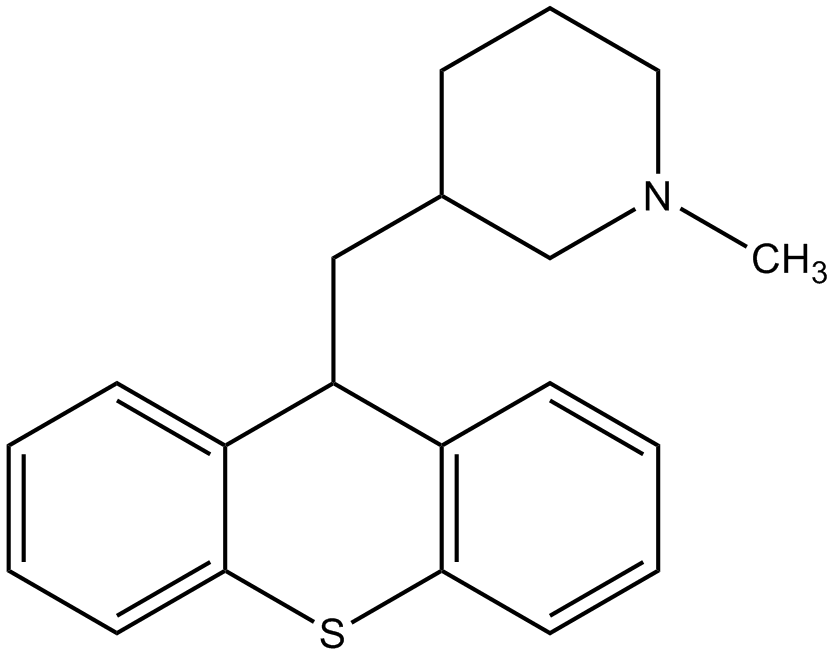

Clinical data
- AHFS/Drugs.com: International Drug Names
- ATC code: N04AA03 (WHO)

Legal status
- Legal status: BR: Class C1 (Other controlled substances)

Identifiers
- IUPAC name: 1-methyl-3-(9H-thioxanthen-9-ylmethyl)piperidine
- CAS Number: 4969-02-2
- PubChem CID: 4167
- IUPHAR/BPS: 7232
- DrugBank: DB00340
- ChemSpider: 4023
- UNII: 32VY6L26ZW
- KEGG: D08209
- ChEBI: CHEBI:51024
- ChEMBL: ChEMBL1201342
- CompTox Dashboard (EPA): DTXSID1047867
- ECHA InfoCard: 100.023.282

Chemical and physical data
- Formula: C_{20}H_{23}NS
- Molar mass: 309.47 g·mol^{−1}
- 3D model (JSmol): Interactive image
- SMILES: CN1CCCC(C1)CC2C3=CC=CC=C3SC4=CC=CC=C24
- InChI: InChI=1S/C20H23NS/c1-21-12-6-7-15(14-21)13-18-16-8-2-4-10-19(16)22-20-11-5-3-9-17(18)20/h2-5,8-11,15,18H,6-7,12-14H2,1H3; Key:MJFJKKXQDNNUJF-UHFFFAOYSA-N

Metixene (brand names Methixart, CholinFall, Tremonil, Trest), also known as methixene, is an anticholinergic used as an antiparkinsonian agent. It has also been reported to induce incomplete autophagy and cell death in metastatic cancer and brain metastases.

== See also ==
- 3-Quinuclidinyl thiochromane-4-carboxylate
- Dothiepin
