= Triamcinolone benetonide =

Chemical compound

Clinical data
- Trade names: Alcorten, Benecorten, Tibicorten
- Other names: Triamcinolone acetonide benzoyl-β-aminoisobutyrate; TBI; 9-Fluoro-11β,16α,17,21-tetrahydroxypregna-1,4-diene-3,20-dione cyclic 16,17-acetal with acetone 21-ester with N-benzoyl-2-methyl-β-alanine
- Drug class: Corticosteroid; Glucocorticoid

Identifiers
- IUPAC name: 2-[(4aS,4bR,5S,6aS,6bS,9aR,10aS,10bS)-4b-Fluoro-5-hydroxy-4a,6a,8,8-tetramethyl-2-oxo-2,4a,4b,5,6,6a,9a,10,10a,10b,11,12-dodecahydro-6bH-naphtho[2',1':4,5]indeno[1,2-d][1,3]dioxol-6b-yl]-2-oxoethyl 3-(benzoylamino)-2-methylpropanoate
- CAS Number: 31002-79-6
- PubChem CID: 62963
- ChemSpider: 56674
- UNII: 9DXL8A82MI
- ChEBI: CHEBI:135852
- ChEMBL: ChEMBL2105798
- CompTox Dashboard (EPA): DTXSID601026586
- ECHA InfoCard: 100.045.829

Chemical and physical data
- Formula: C_{35}H_{42}FNO_{8}
- Molar mass: 623.718 g·mol^{−1}
- 3D model (JSmol): Interactive image
- SMILES: CC(CNC(=O)C1=CC=CC=C1)C(=O)OCC(=O)[C@@]23[C@@H](C[C@@H]4[C@@]2(C[C@@H]([C@]5([C@H]4CCC6=CC(=O)C=C[C@@]65C)F)O)C)OC(O3)(C)C
- InChI: InChI=1S/C35H42FNO8/c1-20(18-37-29(41)21-9-7-6-8-10-21)30(42)43-19-27(40)35-28(44-31(2,3)45-35)16-25-24-12-11-22-15-23(38)13-14-32(22,4)34(24,36)26(39)17-33(25,35)5/h6-10,13-15,20,24-26,28,39H,11-12,16-19H2,1-5H3,(H,37,41)/t20?,24-,25-,26-,28+,32-,33-,34-,35+/m0/s1; Key:GUYPYYARYIIWJZ-CYEPYHPTSA-N

Triamcinolone benetonide (brand names Alcorten, Benecorten, Tibicorten; also known as triamcinolone acetonide 21-(benzoyl-β-aminoisobutyrate) or TBI) is a synthetic glucocorticoid corticosteroid.
