= Pentoxifylline =

Chemical compound

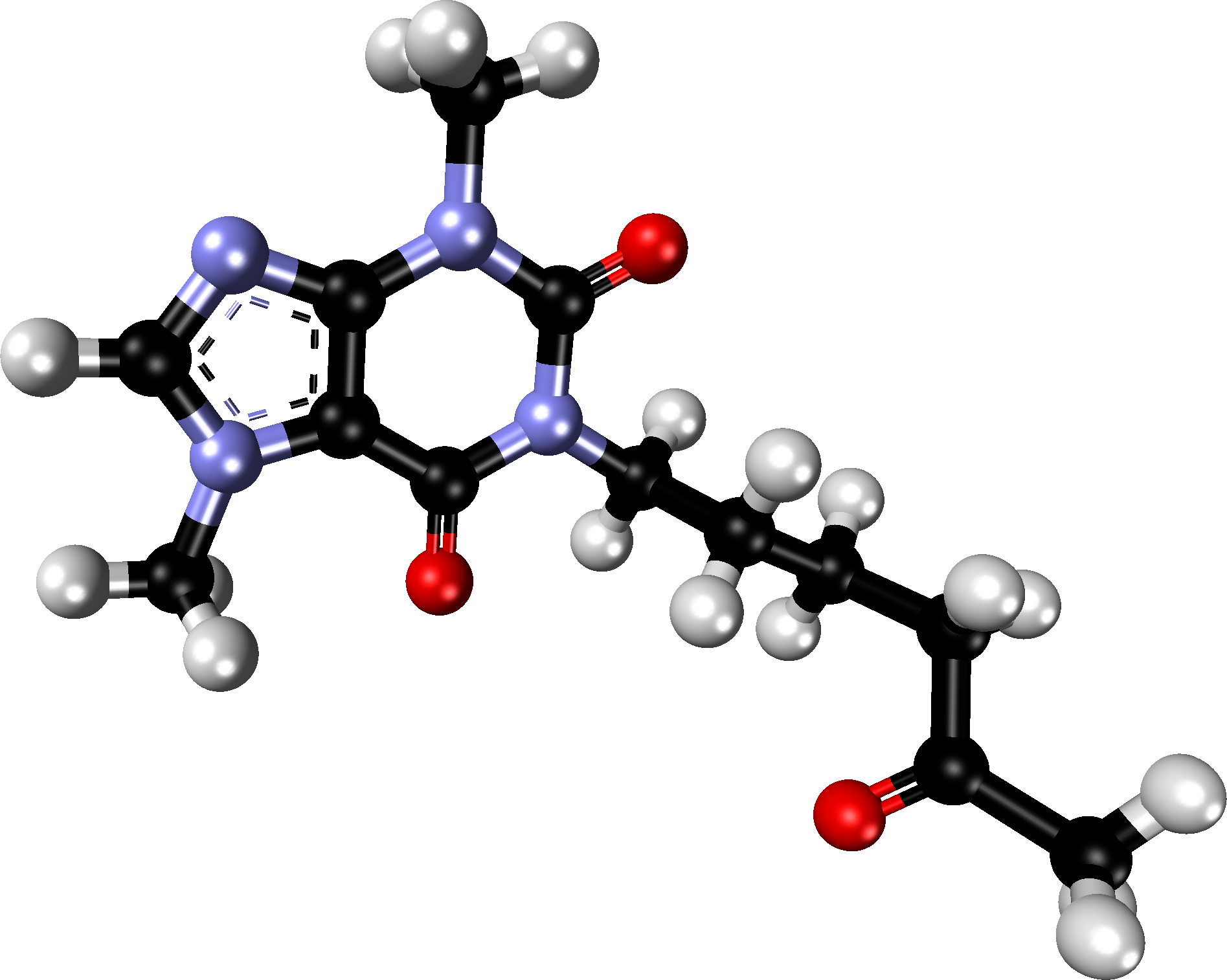

Clinical data
- Pronunciation: /ˌpɛntɒkˈsɪfɪliːn, -ɪn/
- Trade names: Trental, many other names worldwide
- Other names: oxpentifylline (former AAN)
- AHFS/Drugs.com: Monograph
- MedlinePlus: a685027
- License data: US FDA: Pentoxifylline
- Pregnancy category: AU: B1
- Routes of administration: By mouth
- ATC code: C04AD03 (WHO)

Legal status
- Legal status: AU: S4 (Prescription only); CA: ℞-only; UK: POM (Prescription only); US: ℞-only

Pharmacokinetic data
- Bioavailability: 10–30%
- Metabolism: Hepatic and via erythrocytes
- Elimination half-life: 0.4–0.8 hours (1–1.6 hours for active metabolite)
- Excretion: Urine (95%), faeces (<4%)

Identifiers
- IUPAC name: 3,7-Dimethyl-1-(5-oxohexyl)purine-2,6-dione
- CAS Number: 6493-05-6
- PubChem CID: 4740
- IUPHAR/BPS: 7095
- DrugBank: DB00806
- ChemSpider: 4578
- UNII: SD6QCT3TSU
- KEGG: D00501
- ChEMBL: ChEMBL628
- CompTox Dashboard (EPA): DTXSID7023437
- ECHA InfoCard: 100.026.704

Chemical and physical data
- Formula: C_{13}H_{18}N_{4}O_{3}
- Molar mass: 278.312 g·mol^{−1}
- 3D model (JSmol): Interactive image
- SMILES: O=C2N(c1ncn(c1C(=O)N2CCCCC(=O)C)C)C
- InChI: InChI=1S/C13H18N4O3/c1-9(18)6-4-5-7-17-12(19)10-11(14-8-15(10)2)16(3)13(17)20/h8H,4-7H2,1-3H3; Key:BYPFEZZEUUWMEJ-UHFFFAOYSA-N

Pentoxifylline, also known as oxpentifylline, is a xanthine derivative used as a drug to treat muscle pain in people with peripheral artery disease. It was approved for medical use in 1984 and is available as generic and sold under many brand names worldwide like Trental.

== Medical uses ==
Its primary use in medicine is to reduce pain, cramping, numbness, or weakness in the arms or legs which occurs due to intermittent claudication, a form of muscle pain resulting from peripheral artery diseases. This is its only FDA, MHRA and TGA-labelled indication. However, pentoxifylline is also recommended for off-label use as an adjunct to compression bandaging for the treatment of chronic venous leg ulcers by the Scottish Intercollegiate Guidelines Network (SIGN) as this has been shown to improve healing rates.

== Adverse effects ==
Common side effects are belching, bloating, stomach discomfort or upset, nausea, vomiting, indigestion, dizziness, and flushing. Uncommon and rare side effects include angina, palpitations, hypersensitivity, itchiness, rash, hives, bleeding (sometimes to the point of hematuria where your urine may come out pink or slightly red cast), hallucinations, arrhythmias, and aseptic meningitis.

Contraindications include intolerance to pentoxifylline or other xanthine derivatives, recent retinal or cerebral haemorrhage, and risk factors for haemorrhage.

== Mechanism ==
Like other methylated xanthine derivatives, pentoxifylline is a competitive nonselective phosphodiesterase inhibitor which raises intracellular cAMP, activates PKA, inhibits TNF and leukotriene synthesis, and reduces inflammation and innate immunity. In addition, pentoxifylline improves red blood cell deformability (known as a haemorrheologic effect), reduces blood viscosity and decreases the potential for platelet aggregation and blood clot formation. Pentoxifylline is also an antagonist at adenosine 2 receptors.

Its metabolite lisophillyine is stronger PDE inhibitor than pentoxifylline in vitro.

== Research ==
A 2015 Cochrane systematic review on the use of pentoxifylline for intermittent claudication in 2015 concluded: "The quality of included studies was generally low, and very large variability between studies was noted in reported findings including duration of trials, doses of pentoxifylline and distances participants could walk at the start of trials. Most included studies did not report on randomisation techniques or how treatment allocation was concealed, did not provide adequate information to permit judgement of selective reporting and did not report blinding of outcome assessors. Given all these factors, the role of pentoxifylline in intermittent claudication remains uncertain, although this medication was generally well tolerated by participants".

Pentoxifylline has been tested for use in sarcoidosis patients as an alternative or complement to prednisone and other steroids, as the drug can inhibit excess levels of TNF-a, which is associated with granuloma formation.

It has further been used to treat immunologic reactions to leprosy with some success. Benefit in alcoholic hepatitis was shown, with some studies demonstrating a reduction in risk of hepatorenal syndrome. There is some evidence that pentoxifylline can lower the levels of some biomarkers in non-alcoholic steatohepatitis but evidence is insufficient to determine if the drug is safe and effective for this use.

For in vitro fertilization, Pentoxifylline has been used to improve sperm quality and motility and as safe oral drug in the treatment of male infertility with erectile dysfunction. Animal studies have been conducted exploring the use of pentoxifylline for erectile dysfunction.

An off-label indication of pentoxifylline is the supportive treatment of distal diabetic neuropathy, where it can be added, for example, to thioctic acid or gabapentin. Theoretically, it can (among other things) act prophylactically against ulcerative changes of the lower limbs associated with chronically decompensated diabetes. Patients with measurable impairment in arterial supply are more likely to benefit from adjunctive treatment with pentoxifylline. The administration of higher doses of pentoxifylline in hospitalization for complications of distal diabetic neuropathy is usually conditioned by the joint agreement of the neurologist with the physicians of internal medicine (diabetology and angiology).

Pentoxifylline may be used transdermally for cellulite treatment.

A 2025 systematic review found that pentoxifylline may effectively treat some forms of inner ear vertigo and acute tinnitus, though its impact on idiopathic sudden sensorineural hearing loss remains inconsistent and often suggests ineffectiveness. Animal studies have been conducted exploring the use of pentoxifylline for hearing loss.

Pentoxifylline has been studied and adopted by some clinicians as an oral treatment for Peyronie's disease. It's proposed to act through multiple mechanisms, including antioxidant, antifibrotic (including reducing TGF-β), and anti-inflammatory pathways, to interfere with the disease's pathogenesis and reduce symptoms such as penile curvature, pain, and plaque volume. While systematic reviews indicate a lack of consistent large-scale evidence for its efficacy, various clinical studies and case reports suggest that pentoxifylline, especially in combination with other therapies, may effectively reduce the progression of Peyronie's disease.

The combination of tocopherol and pentoxifylline has been evaluated for the treatment of medication-related osteonecrosis of the jaw. Pentoxifylline, in combination with tocopherol and clodronate, has also been found to heal refractory osteoradionecrosis of the jaw, and to be prophylactic against osteoradionecrosis.

Meta-analyses have found that pentoxifylline may be an effective adjunctive treatment for certain cases of major depressive disorder. Clinical studies demonstrated that adding pentoxifylline to standard selective serotonin reuptake inhibitor therapy significantly improved depressive symptom scores on rating scales and increased patient response and remission rates compared to placebo. The drug was associated with improvement in certain forms of cognitive impairment, particularly in vascular dementia.

== See also ==
- Lisofylline, an active metabolite of pentoxifylline
- Propentofylline
- Cilostazol, a PDE-3 inhibitor with better evidence for intermittent claudication on the Cochrane review cited above.
