= Trimethobenzamide =

Antiemetic medication

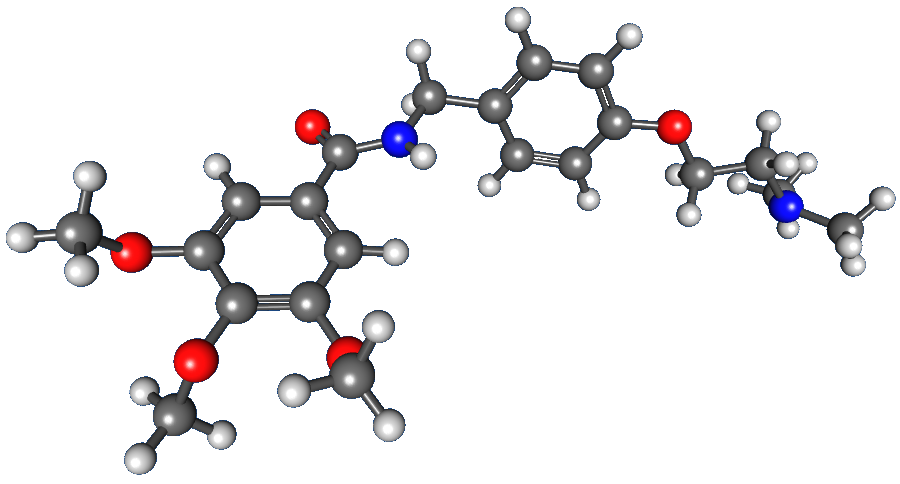

Clinical data
- Trade names: Tigan, Tebamide
- AHFS/Drugs.com: Monograph
- MedlinePlus: a682693
- Routes of administration: Oral, rectal, intramuscular
- ATC code: R06AA10 (WHO)

Legal status
- Legal status: US: ℞-only

Pharmacokinetic data
- Bioavailability: 60-100%
- Elimination half-life: 7 to 9 hours (mean)
- Excretion: urine (30-50%), faeces

Identifiers
- IUPAC name: N-{[4-(2-dimethylaminoethoxy)phenyl]methyl}- 3,4,5-trimethoxy-benzamide
- CAS Number: 138-56-7
- PubChem CID: 5577
- IUPHAR/BPS: 7614
- DrugBank: DB00662
- ChemSpider: 5375
- UNII: W2X096QY97
- ChEBI: CHEBI:27796
- ChEMBL: ChEMBL1201256
- CompTox Dashboard (EPA): DTXSID8023711
- ECHA InfoCard: 100.004.848

Chemical and physical data
- Formula: C_{21}H_{28}N_{2}O_{5}
- Molar mass: 388.464 g·mol^{−1}
- 3D model (JSmol): Interactive image
- SMILES: O=C(c1cc(OC)c(OC)c(OC)c1)NCc2ccc(OCCN(C)C)cc2
- InChI: InChI=1S/C21H28N2O5/c1-23(2)10-11-28-17-8-6-15(7-9-17)14-22-21(24)16-12-18(25-3)20(27-5)19(13-16)26-4/h6-9,12-13H,10-11,14H2,1-5H3,(H,22,24); Key:FEZBIKUBAYAZIU-UHFFFAOYSA-N

Trimethobenzamide (trade names Tebamide, Tigan) is an antiemetic used to prevent nausea and vomiting.

== Mechanism of action ==
Trimethobenzamide is an antagonist of the D_{2} receptor. It is believed to affect the chemoreceptor trigger zone (CTZ) of the medulla oblongata to suppress nausea and vomiting.

== Side effects ==
Possible side effects include drowsiness, dizziness, headache, muscle cramps, and blurred vision. More serious adverse effects include skin rash, tremors, parkinsonism, and jaundice.

== Formulations ==
Trimethobenzamide is marketed under the brand names Tebamide and Tigan, manufactured by GlaxoSmithKline and King Pharmaceuticals, respectively. It is available as oral capsules and injectable formulations.

Trimethobenzamide was also available as a rectal suppository, but such formulations were banned by the U.S. Food and Drug Administration on April 6, 2007, due to unproven efficacy.

== Synthesis ==
Trimethobenzamide synthesis: Hoffmann La Roche, U.S. patent 2,879,293 (1959).

Alkylation of the sodium salt of p-hydroxybenzaldehyde (1) with 2-dimethylaminoethyl chloride affords the ether (2). Reductive amination of the aldehyde in the presence of ammonia gives diamine (3). Acylation of that product with 3,4,5-trimethoxybenzoyl chloride affords trimethobenzamide (4).

== See also ==
- Domperidone
- Metoclopramide
