= Procinonide =

Chemical compound

Clinical data
- Other names: RS-2362; Fluocinolone acetonide propionate; Fluocinolone acetonide 21-propionate; 6α,9α-Difluoro-11β,16α,17α,21-tetrahydroxypregna-1,4-diene-3,20-dione cyclic 16,17-acetal with acetone 21-propionate; 6α,9α-Difluoro-11β-hydroxy-16α,17α-[isopropylidenebis(oxy)]pregna-1,4-diene-3,20-dione 21-propionate
- Drug class: Corticosteroid; Glucocorticoid

Identifiers
- IUPAC name: 2-[(4aS,4bR,5S,6aS,6bS,9aR,10aS,10bS,12S)-4b,12-Difluoro-5-hydroxy-4a,6a,8,8-tetramethyl-2-oxo-2,4a,4b,5,6,6a,9a,10,10a,10b,11,12-dodecahydro-6bH-naphtho[2',1':4,5]indeno[1,2-d][1,3]dioxol-6b-yl]-2-ox oethyl propionate
- CAS Number: 58497-00-0
- PubChem CID: 9806281
- ChemSpider: 7982040
- UNII: D04S7VLM8Q
- KEGG: D05616
- ChEMBL: ChEMBL2106554
- CompTox Dashboard (EPA): DTXSID501024163
- ECHA InfoCard: 100.055.699

Chemical and physical data
- Formula: C_{27}H_{34}F_{2}O_{7}
- Molar mass: 508.559 g·mol^{−1}
- 3D model (JSmol): Interactive image
- SMILES: CCC(=O)OCC(=O)[C@@]12[C@@H](C[C@@H]3[C@@]1(C[C@@H]([C@]4([C@H]3C[C@@H](C5=CC(=O)C=C[C@@]54C)F)F)O)C)OC(O2)(C)C
- InChI: InChI=1S/C27H34F2O7/c1-6-22(33)34-13-20(32)27-21(35-23(2,3)36-27)11-15-16-10-18(28)17-9-14(30)7-8-24(17,4)26(16,29)19(31)12-25(15,27)5/h7-9,15-16,18-19,21,31H,6,10-13H2,1-5H3/t15-,16-,18-,19-,21+,24-,25-,26-,27+/m0/s1; Key:UBOIMZIXNXGQOH-RTWVSBIPSA-N

Procinonide (developmental code RS-2362; also known as fluocinolone acetonide propionate) is a synthetic glucocorticoid corticosteroid which was never marketed.
