= Triamcinolone furetonide =

Chemical compound

Clinical data
- Other names: HE-192; Triamcinolone acetonide 21-(2-benzofurancarboxylate); 9α-Fluoro-11β,16α,17α,21-tetrahydroxypregna-1,4-diene-3,20-dione cyclic 16,17-acetal with acetone, 21-(2-benzofurancarboxylate)
- Drug class: Corticosteroid; Glucocorticoid

Identifiers
- IUPAC name: 2-[(4aS,4bR,5S,6aS,6bS,9aR,10aS,10bS)-4b-Fluoro-5-hydroxy-4a,6a,8,8-tetramethyl-2-oxo-2,4a,4b,5,6,6a,9a,10,10a,10b,11,12-dodecahydro-6bH-naphtho[2',1':4,5]indeno[1,2-d][1,3]dioxol-6b-yl]-2-oxoethyl 1-benzofuran-2-carboxylate
- CAS Number: 4989-94-0
- PubChem CID: 62964
- ChemSpider: 56675
- UNII: O49NOC9ROC
- ChEMBL: ChEMBL2105791
- CompTox Dashboard (EPA): DTXSID00198138
- ECHA InfoCard: 100.023.319

Chemical and physical data
- Formula: C_{33}H_{35}FO_{8}
- Molar mass: 578.633 g·mol^{−1}
- 3D model (JSmol): Interactive image
- SMILES: C[C@]12C[C@@H]([C@]3([C@H]([C@@H]1C[C@@H]4[C@]2(OC(O4)(C)C)C(=O)COC(=O)C5=CC6=CC=CC=C6O5)CCC7=CC(=O)C=C[C@@]73C)F)O
- InChI: InChI=1S/C33H35FO8/c1-29(2)41-27-15-22-21-10-9-19-14-20(35)11-12-30(19,3)32(21,34)25(36)16-31(22,4)33(27,42-29)26(37)17-39-28(38)24-13-18-7-5-6-8-23(18)40-24/h5-8,11-14,21-22,25,27,36H,9-10,15-17H2,1-4H3/t21-,22-,25-,27+,30-,31-,32-,33+/m0/s1; Key:OSWKQSQWSQSPQH-GNFRAIDCSA-N

Triamcinolone furetonide (developmental code name HE-192; also known as triamcinolone acetonide 21-(2-benzofurancarboxylate)) is a synthetic glucocorticoid corticosteroid which was never marketed.
