= Trimetozine =

Chemical compound

Clinical data
- AHFS/Drugs.com: International Drug Names
- Routes of administration: Oral
- ATC code: none

Legal status
- Legal status: In general: ℞ (Prescription only)

Identifiers
- IUPAC name: Morpholin-4-yl-(3,4,5-trimethoxyphenyl)methanone
- CAS Number: 635-41-6
- PubChem CID: 12478
- ChemSpider: 11968
- UNII: 31EPT7G9PL
- ChEMBL: ChEMBL1697853
- CompTox Dashboard (EPA): DTXSID8023713
- ECHA InfoCard: 100.010.215

Chemical and physical data
- Formula: C_{14}H_{19}NO_{5}
- Molar mass: 281.308 g·mol^{−1}
- 3D model (JSmol): Interactive image
- SMILES: COC1=CC(=CC(=C1OC)OC)C(=O)N2CCOCC2

Trimetozine (Opalene, Trimolide, Trioxazine) is a sedative that has been marketed in Europe since 1959. It also has mild tranquilizing effects and has been used in the treatment of anxiety. Its mechanism of action is unclear.

Conversion of the amide in trimetozine to the thioamide gives trithiozine.
