= Triclonide =

Chemical compound

Clinical data
- Other names: RS-4464; 6α-Fluoro-9α,11β,21-trichloro-16α,17α-dihydroxypregna-1,4-diene-3,20-dione cyclic acetal with acetone; 6α-Fluoro-9α,11β,21-trichloro-16α,17α-((1-methylethylidene)bis(oxy))-pregna-1,4-diene-3,20-dione
- Drug class: Corticosteroid; Glucocorticoid

Identifiers
- IUPAC name: (4aS,4bR,5S,6aS,6bS,9aR,10aS,10bS,12S)-4b,5-Dichloro-6b-(chloroacetyl)-12-fluoro-4a,6a,8,8-tetramethyl-4a,4b,5,6,6a,6b,9a,10,10a,10b,11,12-dodecahydro-2H-naphtho[2',1':4,5]indeno[1,2-d][1,3]dioxol-2-one
- CAS Number: 26849-57-0
- PubChem CID: 10323902
- ChemSpider: 8499365
- UNII: PSM3RT117Z
- KEGG: D06225
- ChEMBL: ChEMBL2107225
- CompTox Dashboard (EPA): DTXSID40181367

Chemical and physical data
- Formula: C_{24}H_{28}Cl_{3}FO_{4}
- Molar mass: 505.83 g·mol^{−1}
- 3D model (JSmol): Interactive image
- SMILES: C[C@]12C[C@@H]([C@]3([C@H]([C@@H]1C[C@@H]4[C@]2(OC(O4)(C)C)C(=O)CCl)C[C@@H](C5=CC(=O)C=C[C@@]53C)F)Cl)Cl
- InChI: InChI=1S/C24H28Cl3FO4/c1-20(2)31-19-9-13-14-8-16(28)15-7-12(29)5-6-21(15,3)23(14,27)17(26)10-22(13,4)24(19,32-20)18(30)11-25/h5-7,13-14,16-17,19H,8-11H2,1-4H3/t13-,14-,16-,17-,19+,21-,22-,23-,24+/m0/s1; Key:VSVSLEMVVAYTQW-VSXGLTOVSA-N

Triclonide (developmental code name RS-4464) is a synthetic glucocorticoid corticosteroid which was never marketed.
