= Triamcinolone aminobenzal benzamidoisobutyrate =

Chemical compound

Clinical data
- Trade names: Taucorten
- Other names: TBI-PAB; TBI/PAB; Tbi-Pab; 16α,17α-(4-Dimethylamino- benzyliden)triamcinolone 21-(β-benzoylamino)isobutyrate; 21-(3-(benzoylamino)-2-methyl-1-oxopropoxy)-16α,17α-(((4-(dimethylamino)phenyl)- methylene)bis(oxy))-9α-fluoro-11β-hydroxypregna-1,4-diene-3,20-dione
- Drug class: Corticosteroid; Glucocorticoid

Identifiers
- IUPAC name: 2-{(4aS,6aS,6bS,10aS,10bS)-8-[4-(Dimethylamino)phenyl]-4b-fluoro-5-hydroxy-4a,6a-dimethyl-2-oxo-2,4a,4b,5,6,6a,9a,10,10a,10b,11,12-dodecahydro-6bH-naphtho[2',1':4,5]indeno[1,2-d][1,3]dioxol-6b-yl}-2-oxoethyl 3-(benzoylamino)-2-methylpropanoate
- CAS Number: 51241-99-7
- PubChem CID: 3039780
- ChemSpider: 2303233
- UNII: X2TL3ZVQ99

Chemical and physical data
- Formula: C_{41}H_{47}FN_{2}O_{8}
- Molar mass: 714.831 g·mol^{−1}
- 3D model (JSmol): Interactive image
- SMILES: CC(CNC(=O)C1=CC=CC=C1)C(=O)OCC(=O)[C@@]23C(C[C@@H]4[C@@]2(CC(C5([C@H]4CCC6=CC(=O)C=C[C@@]65C)F)O)C)OC(O3)C7=CC=C(C=C7)N(C)C
- InChI: InChI=1S/C41H47FN2O8/c1-24(22-43-35(48)25-9-7-6-8-10-25)36(49)50-23-33(47)41-34(51-37(52-41)26-11-14-28(15-12-26)44(4)5)20-31-30-16-13-27-19-29(45)17-18-38(27,2)40(30,42)32(46)21-39(31,41)3/h6-12,14-15,17-19,24,30-32,34,37,46H,13,16,20-23H2,1-5H3,(H,43,48)/t24?,30-,31-,32?,34?,37?,38-,39-,40?,41+/m0/s1; Key:NHLSSOMFJSWGTD-VYWRQCFVSA-N

Triamcinolone aminobenzal benzamidoisobutyrate (TBI-PAB; brand name Taucorten) is a synthetic glucocorticoid corticosteroid which is no longer marketed.
