= Dexbudesonide =

Chemical compound

Clinical data
- Other names: Budesonide 22R-epimer; 11β,21-Dihydroxy-16α(R),17α-(butylidenebis(oxy))pregna-1,4-diene-3,20-dione
- Drug class: Corticosteroid; Glucocorticoid

Identifiers
- IUPAC name: (4aR,4bS,5S,6aS,6bS,8R,9aR,10aS,10bS)-6b-Glycoloyl-5-hydroxy-4a,6a-dimethyl-8-propyl-4a,4b,5,6,6a,6b,9a,10,10a,10b,11,12-dodecahydro-2H-naphtho[2',1':4,5]indeno[1,2-d][1,3]dioxol-2-one
- CAS Number: 51372-29-3
- PubChem CID: 40000
- ChemSpider: 36566
- UNII: 2HI1006KPH
- CompTox Dashboard (EPA): DTXSID401017799
- ECHA InfoCard: 100.051.947

Chemical and physical data
- Formula: C_{25}H_{34}O_{6}
- Molar mass: 430.541 g·mol^{−1}
- 3D model (JSmol): Interactive image
- SMILES: CCC[C@@H]1O[C@@H]2C[C@H]3[C@@H]4CCC5=CC(=O)C=C[C@@]5([C@H]4[C@H](C[C@@]3([C@@]2(O1)C(=O)CO)C)O)C
- InChI: InChI=1S/C25H34O6/c1-4-5-21-30-20-11-17-16-7-6-14-10-15(27)8-9-23(14,2)22(16)18(28)12-24(17,3)25(20,31-21)19(29)13-26/h8-10,16-18,20-22,26,28H,4-7,11-13H2,1-3H3/t16-,17-,18-,20+,21+,22+,23-,24-,25+/m0/s1; Key:VOVIALXJUBGFJZ-VXKMTNQYSA-N

Dexbudesonide is a synthetic glucocorticoid corticosteroid which was never marketed. It is the 22R-epimer of budesonide.
