= Tralonide =

Chemical compound

Clinical data
- Trade names: Talidan
- Other names: 6α,21-Difluoro-9α,11β-dichloro-16α,17α-dihydroxypregna-1,4-diene-3,20-dione 16,17-acetonide; 6α,21-Difluoro-9α,11β-dichloro-16α,17α-[(1-methylethylidene)bis(oxy)]pregna-1,4-diene-3,20-dione
- Drug class: Corticosteroid; Glucocorticoid

Identifiers
- IUPAC name: (4aS,4bR,5S,6aS,6bS,9aR,10aS,10bS,12S)-4b,5-Dichloro-12-fluoro-6b-(fluoroacetyl)-4a,6a,8,8-tetramethyl-4a,4b,5,6,6a,6b,9a,10,10a,10b,11,12-dodecahydro-2H-naphtho[2',1':4,5]indeno[1,2-d][1,3]dioxol-2-one
- CAS Number: 21365-49-1
- PubChem CID: 20055296
- UNII: 38ETX8IT42
- KEGG: D06201
- ChEMBL: ChEMBL2105543
- CompTox Dashboard (EPA): DTXSID60175627

Chemical and physical data
- Formula: C_{24}H_{28}Cl_{2}F_{2}O_{4}
- Molar mass: 489.38 g·mol^{−1}
- 3D model (JSmol): Interactive image
- SMILES: CC1(OC2CC3C4CC(C5=CC(=O)C=CC5(C4(C(CC3(C2(O1)C(=O)CF)C)Cl)Cl)C)F)C
- InChI: InChI=1S/C24H28Cl2F2O4/c1-20(2)31-19-9-13-14-8-16(28)15-7-12(29)5-6-21(15,3)23(14,26)17(25)10-22(13,4)24(19,32-20)18(30)11-27/h5-7,13-14,16-17,19H,8-11H2,1-4H3/t13-,14-,16-,17-,19+,21-,22-,23-,24+/m0/s1; Key:OGZHZYVCWDUIJV-VSXGLTOVSA-N

Tralonide (brand name Talidan) is a synthetic glucocorticoid corticosteroid.
