= Acrocinonide =

Chemical compound

Clinical data
- Other names: Triamcinolone acroleinide; Triamcinolone 16,17-2-propenal acetal; SD 2102-18; 9α-Fluoro-11β,21-dihydroxy-16α,17α-(2-propenylidenedioxy)pregna-1,4-dien-3,20-dione; 9α-Fluoro-11β,16α,17α,21-tetrahydroxypregna-1,4-diene-3,20-dione cyclic 16,17-acetal with acrolein
- Drug class: Corticosteroid; Glucocorticoid

Identifiers
- IUPAC name: (4aS,4bR,5S,6aS,6bS,9aR,10aS,10bS)-4b-Fluoro-6b-glycoloyl-5-hydroxy-4a,6a-dimethyl-8-vinyl-4a,4b,5,6,6a,6b,9a,10,10a,10b,11,12-dodecahydro-2H-naphtho[2',1':4,5]indeno[1,2-d][1,3]dioxol-2-one
- CAS Number: 28971-58-6
- PubChem CID: 11743529
- ChemSpider: 9918233
- UNII: 67N58AU0IZ
- ChEMBL: ChEMBL2105519
- CompTox Dashboard (EPA): DTXSID30183173

Chemical and physical data
- Formula: C_{24}H_{29}FO_{6}
- Molar mass: 432.488 g·mol^{−1}
- 3D model (JSmol): Interactive image
- SMILES: C[C@]12C[C@@H]([C@]3([C@H]([C@@H]1C[C@@H]4[C@]2(OC(O4)C=C)C(=O)CO)CCC5=CC(=O)C=C[C@@]53C)F)O
- InChI: InChI=1S/C24H29FO6/c1-4-20-30-19-10-16-15-6-5-13-9-14(27)7-8-21(13,2)23(15,25)17(28)11-22(16,3)24(19,31-20)18(29)12-26/h4,7-9,15-17,19-20,26,28H,1,5-6,10-12H2,2-3H3/t15-,16-,17-,19+,20?,21-,22-,23-,24+/m0/s1; Key:JGSKXHVNDZFORI-DZPDXEKMSA-N

Acrocinonide (developmental code name SD 2102-18; also known as triamcinolone acroleinide) is a synthetic glucocorticoid corticosteroid which was never marketed.
