= Acetal =

Class of organic compounds

Generic structure of acetals

In organic chemistry, an acetal is a functional group with the connectivity R_{2}C(OR')_{2}. Here, the R groups can be organic fragments (a carbon atom, with arbitrary other atoms attached to that) or hydrogen, while the R' groups must be organic fragments, not hydrogen. The two R' groups can be equivalent to each other (a "symmetric acetal") or not (a "mixed acetal"). An acetal is formed from and convertible to two alcohol molecules and an aldehyde or ketone, but acetals have substantially different chemical stability and reactivity as compared to the analogous carbonyl compounds. The central carbon atom has four bonds to it, and is therefore saturated and has tetrahedral geometry.

The term ketal is sometimes used to identify structures associated with ketones (both R groups are organic fragments rather than hydrogen) rather than aldehydes and, historically, the term acetal was used specifically for the aldehyde-related cases (having at least one hydrogen in place of an R on the central carbon). The IUPAC originally deprecated the usage of the word ketal altogether, but has since reversed its decision. However, in contrast to historical usage, ketals are now a subset of acetals, a term that now encompasses both aldehyde- and ketone-derived structures.

If one of the R groups has an oxygen as the first atom (that is, there are more than two oxygens single-bonded to the central carbon), the functional group is instead an orthoester. In contrast to variations of R, both R' groups are organic fragments. If one R' is a hydrogen, the functional group is instead a hemiacetal, while if both are H, the functional group is a ketone hydrate or aldehyde hydrate.

Formation of an acetal occurs when the hydroxyl group of a hemiacetal becomes protonated and is lost as water. The carbocation that is produced is then rapidly attacked by a molecule of alcohol. Loss of the proton from the attached alcohol gives the acetal.

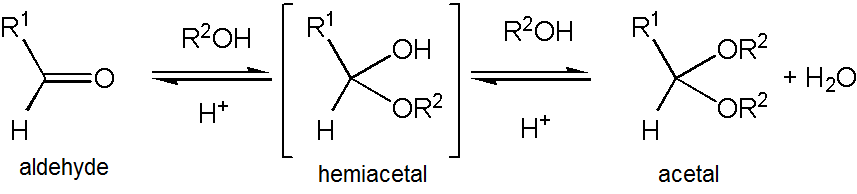
Aldehyde to acetal conversion

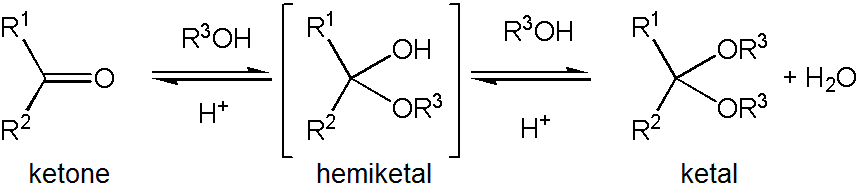
Ketone to ketal conversion

Acetals are stable compared to hemiacetals but their formation is a reversible equilibrium as with esters. As a reaction to create an acetal proceeds, water must be removed from the reaction mixture, for example, with a Dean–Stark apparatus, lest it hydrolyse the product back to the hemiacetal. The formation of acetals reduces the total number of molecules present (carbonyl + 2 alcohol → acetal + water) and therefore is generally not favourable with regard to entropy. One situation where the reaction is not entropically unfavourable is when a single diol molecule is used rather than two separate alcohol molecules (carbonyl + diol → acetal + water).

== Acetalization and ketalization ==
Acetalization and ketalization are the organic reactions that involve the formation of an acetal (or ketals) from aldehydes and ketones, respectively. These conversions are acid catalysed. They eliminate water. Since each step is often a rapid equilibrium, the reaction must be driven by removal of water. Methods for removing water include azeotropic distillation and trapping water with desiccants like aluminium oxide and molecular sieves. Steps assumed to be involved: protonation of the carbonyl oxygen, addition of the alcohol to the protonated carbonyl, protonolysis of the resulting hemiacetal or hemiketal, and addition of the second alcohol. These steps are illustrated with an aldehyde RCH=O and the alcohol R'OH:

RCH=O + H^{+} ⇌ RCH=OH^{+}
RCH=OH^{+} + R'OH ⇌ RCH(OH)(OR') + H^{+}
RCH(OH)(OR') + H^{+} ⇌ RC^{+}H(OR') + H_{2}O
RC^{+}H(OR') + R'OH ⇌ RCH(OR')_{2} + H^{+}

Another way to avoid the entropic cost is to perform the synthesis by acetal exchange (transacetalization), using a pre-existing acetal-type reagent as the OR'-group donor rather than simple addition of alcohols themselves. One type of reagent used for this method is an orthoester. In this case, water produced along with the acetal product is destroyed when it hydrolyses residual orthoester molecules, and this side reaction also produces more alcohol to be used in the main reaction.

== Examples ==
=== Sugars ===
Since many sugars are polyhydroxy aldehydes and ketones, sugars are a rich source of acetals and ketals. Most glycosidic bonds in carbohydrates and other polysaccharides are acetal linkages. Cellulose is a ubiquitous example of a polyacetal.

Benzylidene acetal and acetonide as protecting groups used in research of modified sugars.

=== Chiral derivatives ===
Acetals also find application as chiral auxiliaries. Indeed acetals of chiral glycols like, e.g. derivatives of tartaric acid can be asymmetrically opened with high selectivity. This enables the construction of new chiral centers.

=== Formaldehyde and acetaldehyde ===
Formaldehyde forms a rich collection of acetals. This tendency reflects the fact that low molecular weight aldehydes are prone to self-condensation such that the C=O bond is replaced by an acetal. The acetal formed from formaldehyde (two hydrogens attached to the central carbon) is sometimes called a formal or the methylenedioxy group. The acetal formed from acetone is sometimes called an acetonide. Formaldehyde forms paraformaldehyde and 1,3,5-trioxane. Polyoxymethylene (POM) plastic, also known as "acetal" or "polyacetal", is a polyacetal (and a polyether), and a polymer of formaldehyde. Acetaldehyde converts to paraldehyde and metaldehyde.

=== Unusual acetals ===
Phenylsulfonylethylidene (PSE) acetal is an example of arylsulfonyl acetal possessing atypical properties, like resistance to acid hydrolysis which leads to selective introduction and removal of the protective group.

=== Flavors and fragrances ===
1,1-Diethoxyethane (acetaldehyde diethyl acetal), sometimes called simply "acetal", is an important flavouring compound in sherry, brandy, and other distilled beverages. Two ketals of ethyl acetoacetate are used in commercial fragrances. Fructone (CH_{3}C(O_{2}C_{2}H_{4})CH_{2}CO_{2}C_{2}H_{5}), an ethylene glycol ketal, and fraistone (CH_{3}C(O_{2}C_{2}H_{3}CH_{3})CH_{2}CO_{2}C_{2}H_{5}), a propylene glycol ketal, are commercial fragrances.

== Related compounds ==
Used in a more general sense, the term X,Y-acetal also refers to any functional group that consists of a carbon bearing two heteroatoms X and Y. For example, N,O-acetal refers to compounds of type R^{1}R^{2}C(OR)(NR'_{2}) (R,R' ≠ H) also known as a hemiaminal ether or aminal, a.k.a. aminoacetal.

S,S-acetal refers to compounds of type R^{1}R^{2}C(SR)(SR') (R,R' ≠ H), also known as thioacetal and thioketals.

== See also ==
- Hemiaminal
- Orthoformate
