= Taxodone =

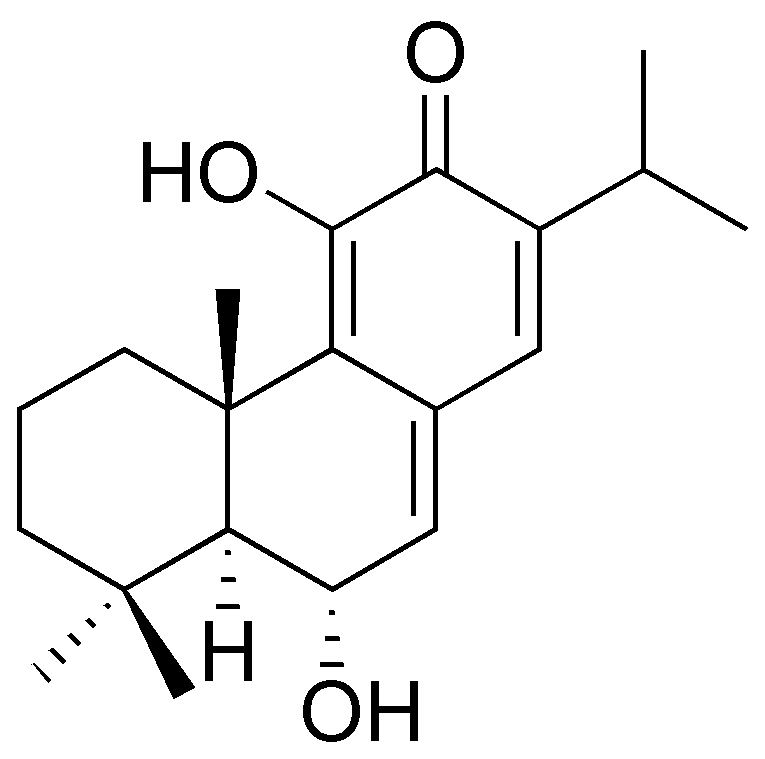

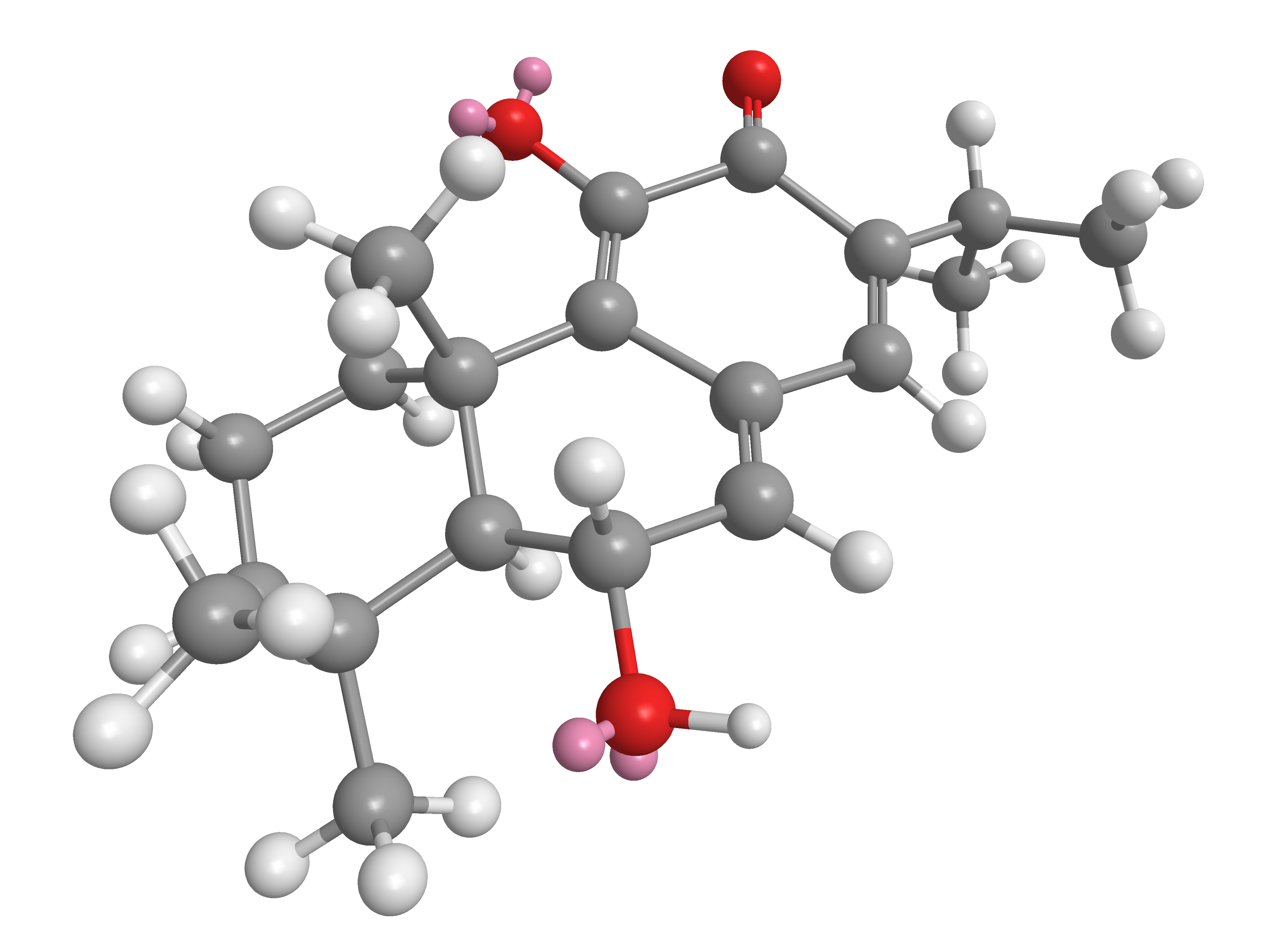

Names
- IUPAC name 6α,11-Dihydroxyabieta-7,9(11),13-trien-12-one
- Systematic IUPAC name (4bS,8aS,9S)-4,9-Dihydroxy-4b,8,8-trimethyl-2-(propan-2-yl)-5,6,7,8,8a,9-hexahydrophenanthren-3(4bH)-one
- Other names NSC122420, AC1L9XIL, CID457961

Identifiers
CAS Number	19039-02-2
3D model (JSmol)	Interactive image
ChemSpider	242416
PubChem CID	275528
- InChI: InChI=1S/C20H28O3/c1-11(2)13-9-12-10-14(21)18-19(3,4)7-6-8-20(18,5)15(12)17(23)16(13)22/h9-11,14,18,21,23H,6-8H2,1-5H3/t14-,18-,20+/m0/s1 Key: QEAIMIKGLGBTSA-ADLFWFRXSA-N; InChI=1/C20H28O3/c1-11(2)13-9-12-10-14(21)18-19(3,4)7-6-8-20(18,5)15(12)17(23)16(13)22/h9-11,14,18,21,23H,6-8H2,1-5H3/t14-,18-,20+/m0/s1 Key: QEAIMIKGLGBTSA-ADLFWFRXBH
- SMILES: O=C1\C(=C/C=2/C(=C1/O)[C@]3(C)[C@@H]([C@@H](O)C=2)C(C)(C)CCC3)C(C)C

Properties
Chemical formula	C_{20}H_{28}O_{3}
Molar mass	316.441 g·mol^{−1}
Appearance	Golden crystalline solid
Melting point	176 to 177 °C (349 to 351 °F; 449 to 450 K)
Solubility in water	Insoluble
Solubility in chloroform, alcohol, hexane, ether	Soluble

Related compounds
Related compounds	Taxodione
- Except where otherwise noted, data are given for materials in their standard state (at 25 °C [77 °F], 100 kPa). verify (what is ?) Infobox references

Taxodone is a naturally occurring diterpenoid found in Taxodium distichum (bald cypress), Rosmarinus officinalis (rosemary), several salvia species and other plants, along with its oxidized rearrangement product, taxodione. Taxodone and taxodione exhibit anticancer, antibacterial, antioxidant, antifungal, insecticide, and antifeedant activities.

== Discovery ==
Taxodone was first isolated in 1968 from the seeds of Taxodium distichum (Bald Cypress) by S. Morris Kupchan and coworkers. They reported the structure determination and basic chemistry of taxodone and its oxidized rearrangement product, taxodione. Taxodone occurs naturally in the form of (+)-taxodone.

== Occurrence ==
Taxodone and/or taxodione have been identified in several plants besides Taxodium distichum including: Rosmarinus officinalis (Rosemary), Salvia barrelieri, Metasequoia glyptostroboides (Dawn Redwood), Salvia munzii (San Diego Sage), Salvia moorcroftiana, Salvia staminea, Salvia clevelandii (Cleveland Sage), Salvia hypargeia, Salvia broussonetii, Salvia montbretii, Salvia nipponica, Salvia verbenaca (Wild Clary), Salvia lanigera, Salvia prionitis, Salvia deserta, Salvia phlomoides, and Plectranthus hereroensis

Taxodone, taxodione and their reaction products have been used as archeological and geological biomarkers.

Analogs of taxodone and taxodione have also been isolated. 2-hydroxy taxodone and 2-hydroxy-taxodione have been found in Salvia texana (Texas Sage). 5,6-Didehydro-7-hydroxy-taxodone was found in Salvia munzii. 7-Hydroxytaxodione, 7,7‘-bistaxodione, and 11,11‘-didehydroxy-7,7‘-dihydroxytaxodione were found in Salvia montbretti.

== Activity ==
Taxodone and taxodione possess in vivo activity against Walker intramuscular carcinosarcoma 256 in rats (25 and 40 mg/kg, respectively) and in vitro activity against cells derived from human carcinoma of the nasopharynx (KB) (ED_{50} = 0.6 and 3 ug/ml respectively). Taxodone and taxodione exhibit antifungal activity against wood decay fungi, with taxodione being especially active against Trametes versicolor and Fomitopsis palustris. Taxodione exhibited the highest antioxidant activity among the tested diterpenoids from the roots of Salvia barrelieri. Taxodone showed potent antibacterial effects against foodborne pathogenic bacteria, such as Listeria monocytogenes ATCC 19166, Salmonella typhimurium KCTC 2515, Salmonella enteritidis KCTC 2021, Escherichia coli ATCC 8739, Escherichia coli O157:H7 ATCC 43888, Enterobacter aerogenes KCTC 2190, Staphylococcus aureus ATCC 6538 and Staphylococcus aureus KCTC 1916 Taxodone showed potent termicidal activity against the subterranean termite, Reticulitermes speratus Kolbe. Taxodione depresses neuronal GABAA receptor-operated Cl-current (IGABA). Taxodione may have potential in treatment of cardiovascular disease.

The use of taxodone and taxodione to inhibit hair growth has been patented. Treatment of benign prostate enlargement with taxodone has also been patented.

== Chemistry ==
Taxodone was the first isolated example of a quinone methide with a labile hydrogen adjacent to this reactive chromophore. Kupchan demonstrated that taxodone aromatizes to a catechol ketone upon exposure to mild acid. Air oxidation of this catechol ketone affords taxodione.

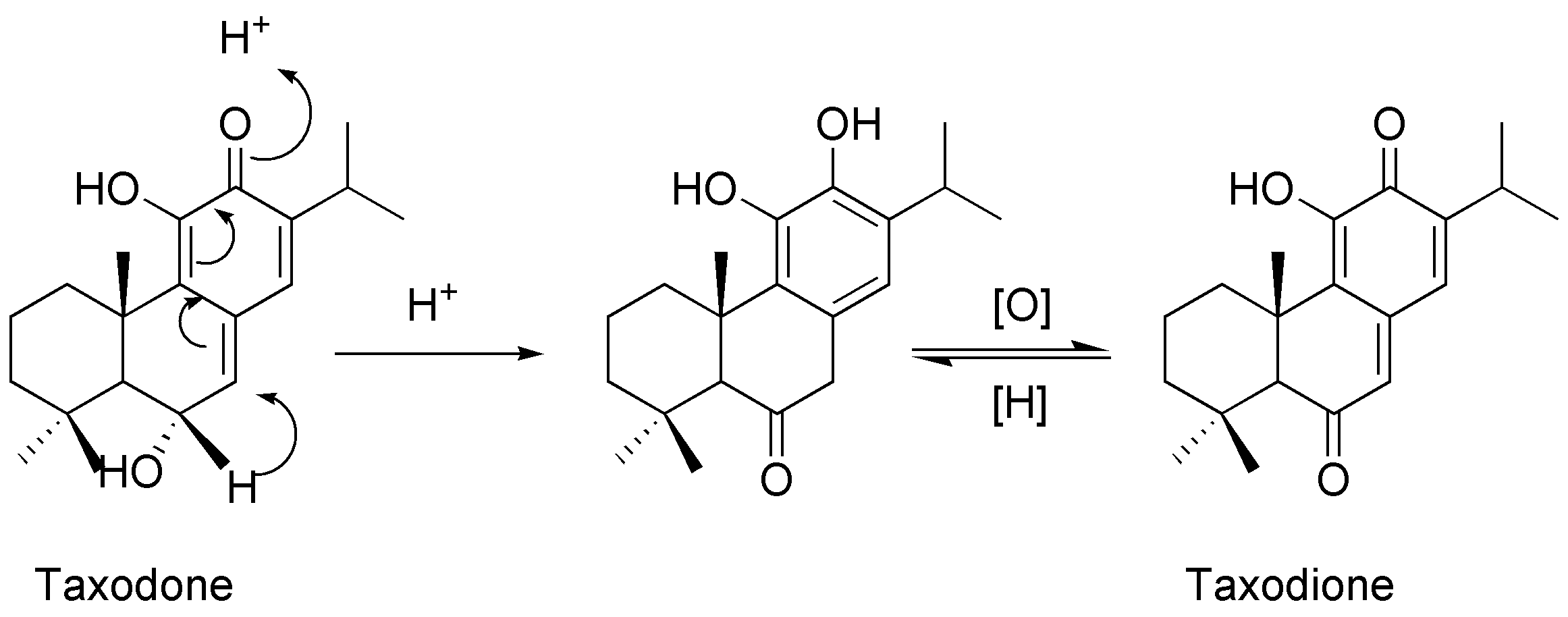

== Synthesis ==
Taxodone rearranges easily in the presence of mild acids and reacts readily with nucleophiles. Although taxodone shows higher anticancer and antibacterial activity than taxodione it eluded creation in the laboratory for over 25 years because of its inherent instability. During this time several different groups reported syntheses of the more stable taxodione.

In 1993 taxodone was synthesized for the first time in a 16 step sequence utilizing a unique phenol benzylic epoxide electron reorganization in the final step. As taxodone readily decomposes into taxodione this synthesis of taxodone also constitutes a formal synthesis of taxodione as well.

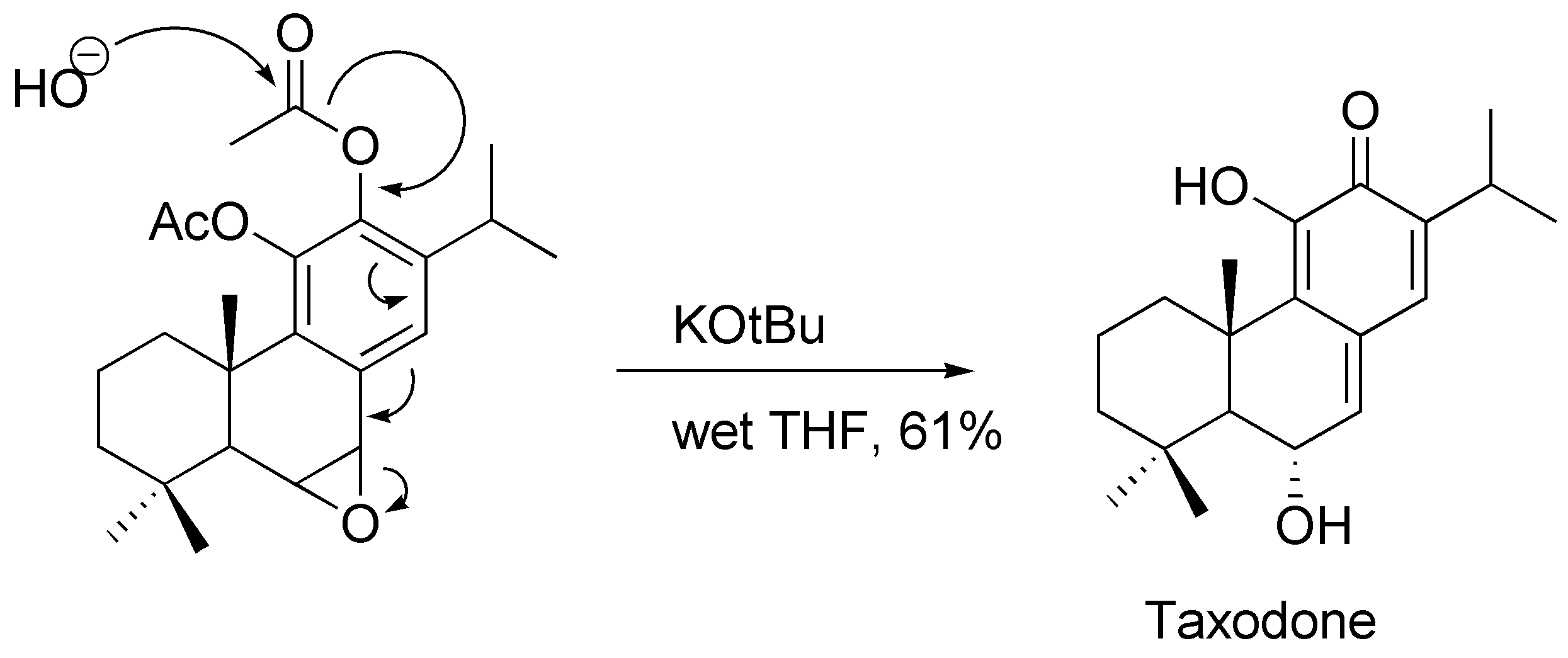

Since the synthesis of taxodone there have been additional syntheses of taxodione and analogs.

== See also ==
- Taxodium distichum
- Quinone methide
- Diterpenoid
- Salvia
