= Quinone methide =

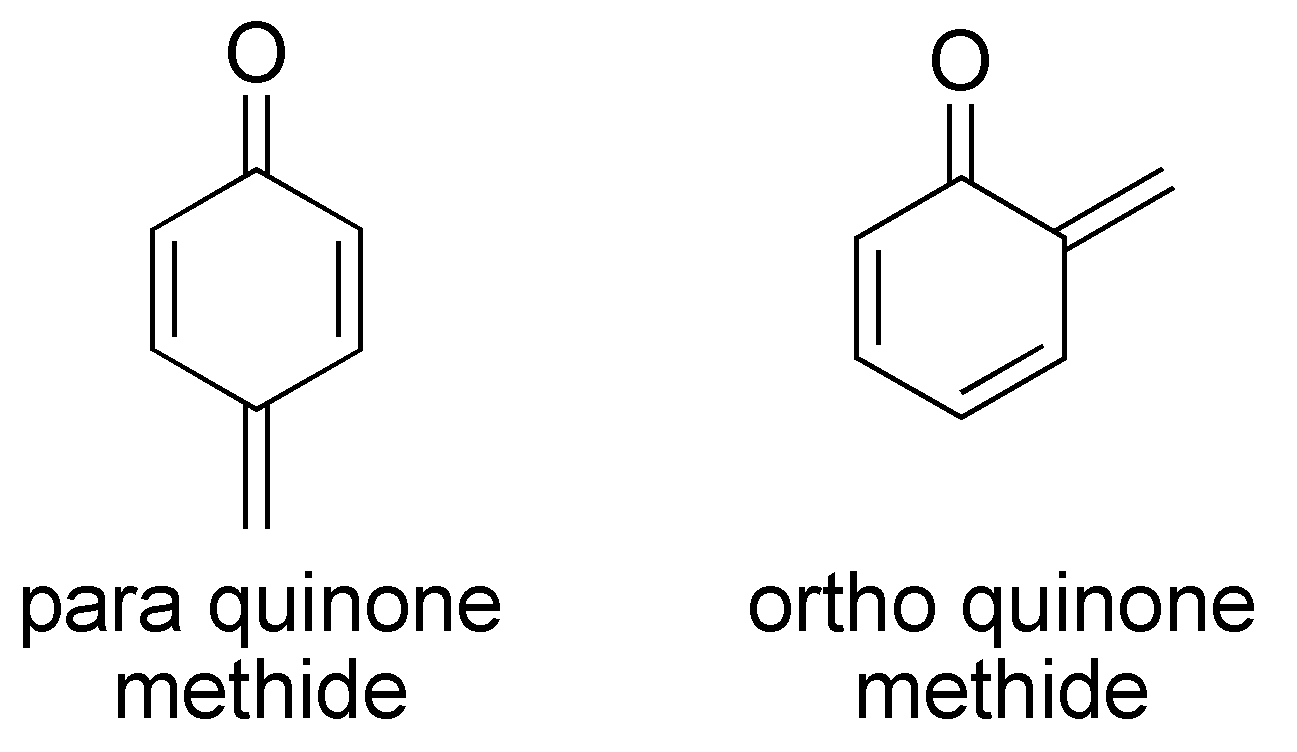

Identifiers
CAS Number	p-: 502-87-4
3D model (JSmol)	o-: Interactive image; p-: Interactive image
Beilstein Reference	o- 1922177
ChEBI	o-: CHEBI:52409; p-: CHEBI:52406
ChemSpider	o-: 10757134; p-: 120102
PubChem CID	o-: 13265823; p-: 136328
UNII	V9FUL88GTN
- InChI: o-: InChI=1S/C7H6O/c1-6-4-2-3-5-7(6)8/h2-5H,1H2 Key: NSDWWGAIPUNJAX-UHFFFAOYSA-N; p-: InChI=1S/C7H6O/c1-6-2-4-7(8)5-3-6/h2-5H,1H2 Key: OJPNKYLDSDFUPG-UHFFFAOYSA-N
- SMILES: o-: C=C1C=CC=CC1=O; p-: C=C1C=CC(=O)C=C1

Properties
Chemical formula	C_{7}H_{6}O
Molar mass	106.124 g·mol^{−1}
- Except where otherwise noted, data are given for materials in their standard state (at 25 °C [77 °F], 100 kPa). Infobox references

A quinone methide is a type of conjugated organic compound that contain a cyclohexadiene with a carbonyl and an exocyclic methylidene or extended alkene unit. It is analogous to a quinone, but having one of the double bonded oxygens replaced with a carbon. The carbonyl and methylidene are usually oriented either ortho or para to each other. There are some examples of transient synthetic meta quinone methides.

== Properties ==
Quinone methides are cross-conjugated rather than aromatic. Nucleophilic addition at the exo-cyclic double bond will result in rearomatisation, making such reactions highly favourable. As a result, quinone methides are excellent, electrophilic Michael acceptors, react quickly with nucleophiles and can be easily reduced. They are able to act as radical scavengers via a similar process, a behaviour exploited by certain polymerisation inhibitors. Quinone methides are more polar than quinones, and therefore more chemically reactive. Simple unhindered quinone methides are short lived reactive intermediates that are not stable enough to be isolated under normal circumstances, they will trimerise in the absence of nucleophiles. Sterically hindered quinone methides can be sufficiently stable to be isolated, with some examples being commercially available.

== Preparation ==
Quinone methides are often prepared by oxidation of the corresponding ortho or para cresol.

Quinone methides can be produced in aqueous solution by photochemical dehydration of o-hydroxybenzyl alcohols (i.e. salicyl alcohol).

== Occurrence and applications ==
=== Lignification and delignification ===
Quinone methides are intermediates in both the biosynthesis and in chemical delignification of lignin. Lignin arises by the coupling of monolignols, via the intermediacy of their quinone methides. The process is promoted by oxidative enzymes.

Delignification is central to the pulp and paper industry. The goal of this industry is the production of cellulose from lignocellulose. Typically, wood is subjected to the Kraft process to cleave the lignin (and hemicellulose) away from the cellulose, which is the main component of paper. The Kraft process uses a combination of sodium hydroxide and sodium hydrosulfide to degrade the lignin, allowing it to be liberated from the cellulose. This breakdown occurs via deprotonation of alkylphenoxides, precursors to quinone methides.

=== Biochemistry ===
In the biosynthesis of hydrogenase active site, quinone methide (per se) arises by the degradation of tyrosine.

=== Medicine ===
Quinone methides have been implicated as the "ultimate" cytotoxins responsible for the effects of such agents as antitumor drugs, antibiotics, and DNA alkylators. Oxidation to a reactive quinone methide is the mechanistic basis of many phenolic anti-cancer drugs.

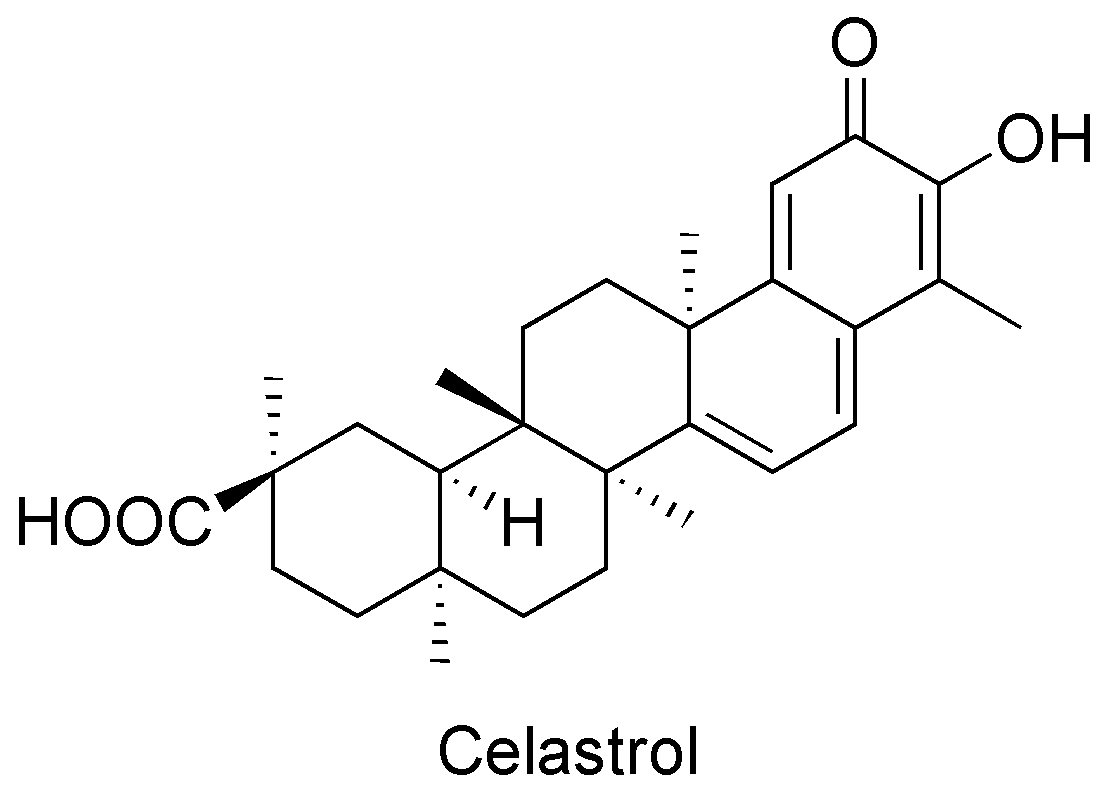
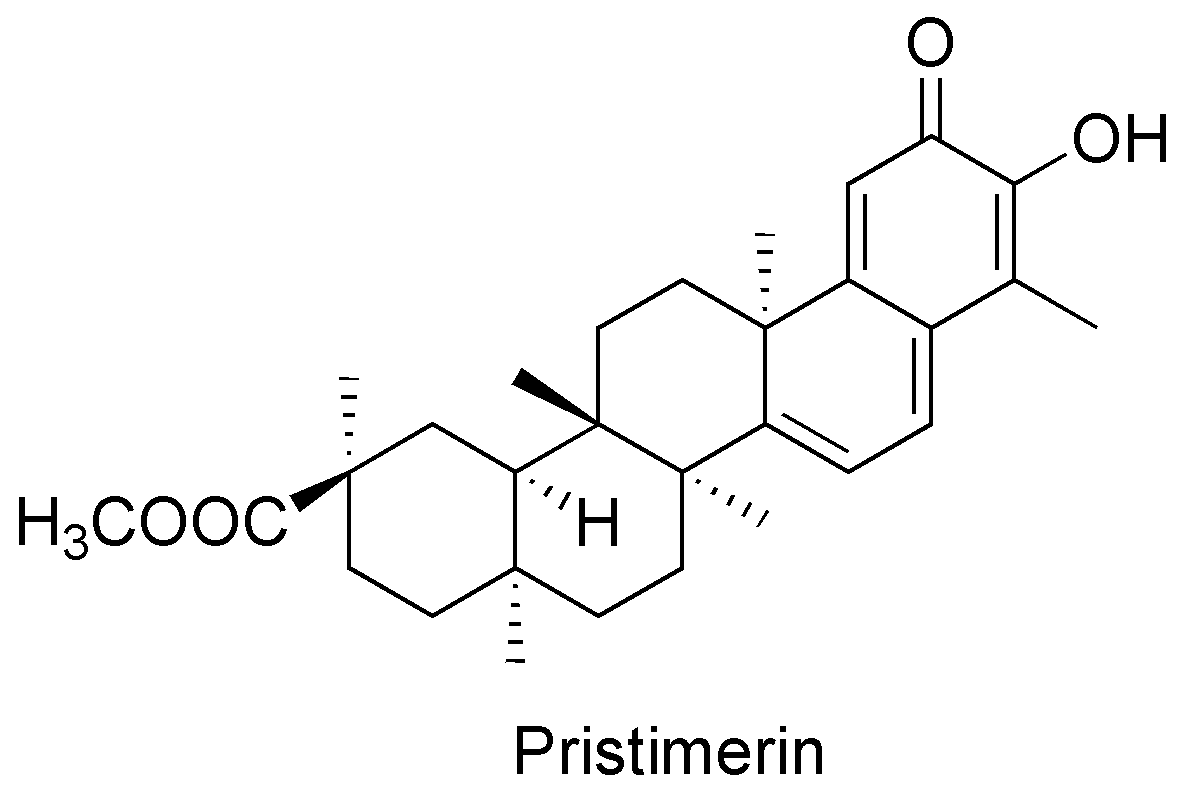

Proposed sequence of reactions with N-acetyldopamine as substrate resulting in sclerotization (formation of exoskeletons of arthropods). The middle step, involving conversion of the ortho quinone to quinone methide, is catalyzed by the enzyme quinone isomerase.

=== Natural products ===
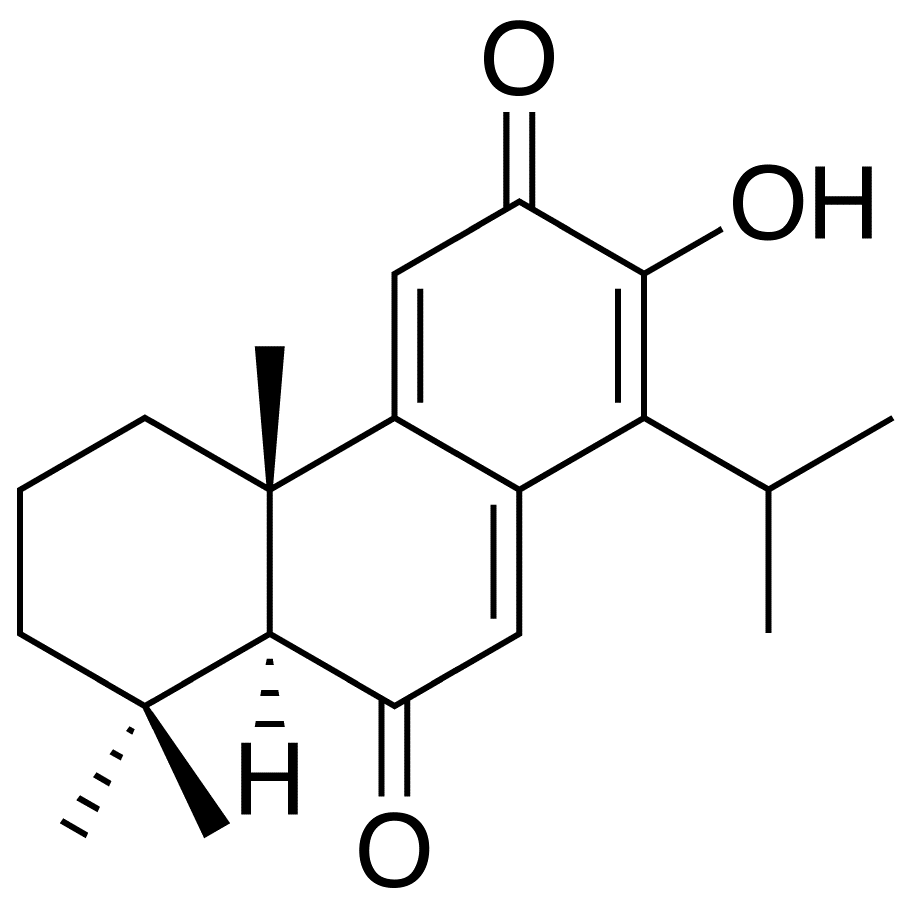
Maytenoquinone

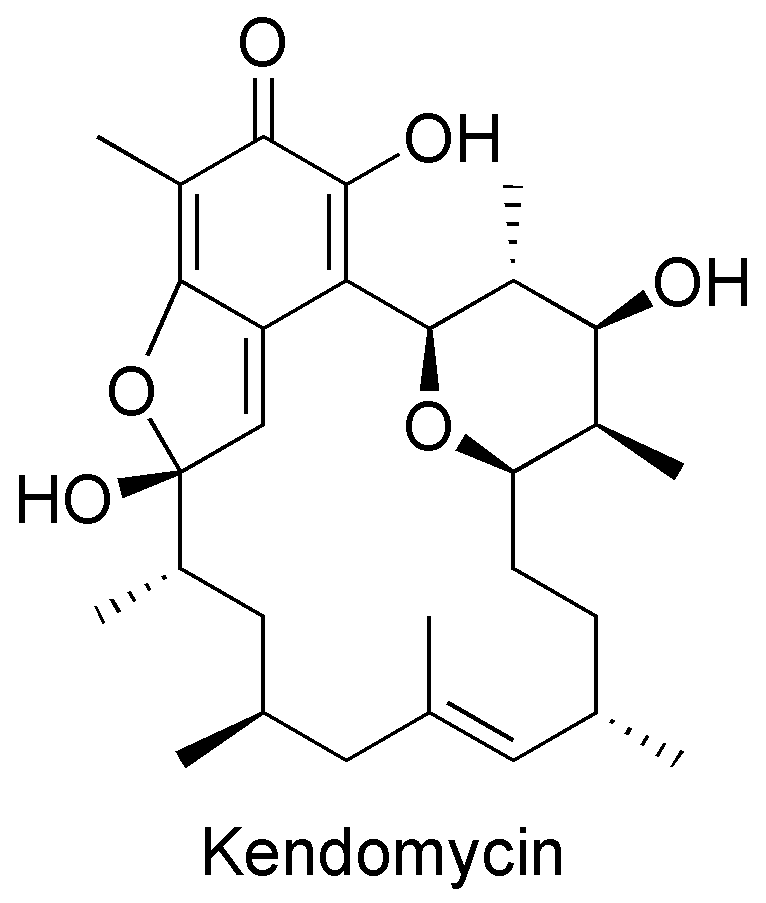
Kendomycin

Although quinone methides are rarely observed in the laboratory, several have been identified from natural sources. Some are bioactive with promise as medicines.

- Celastrol is a triterpenoid quinone methide isolated from Tripterygium wilfordii (Thunder of God vine) and Celastrus regelii.
- Pristimerin, the methyl ester of celasterol, is a triterpenoid quinone methide isolated from Maytenus heterophylla.
- Taxodone and its oxidized rearrangement product, taxodione, are diterpenoid quinone methides found in Taxodium distichum (bald cypress), Rosmarinus officinalis (rosemary), and several Salvia species.

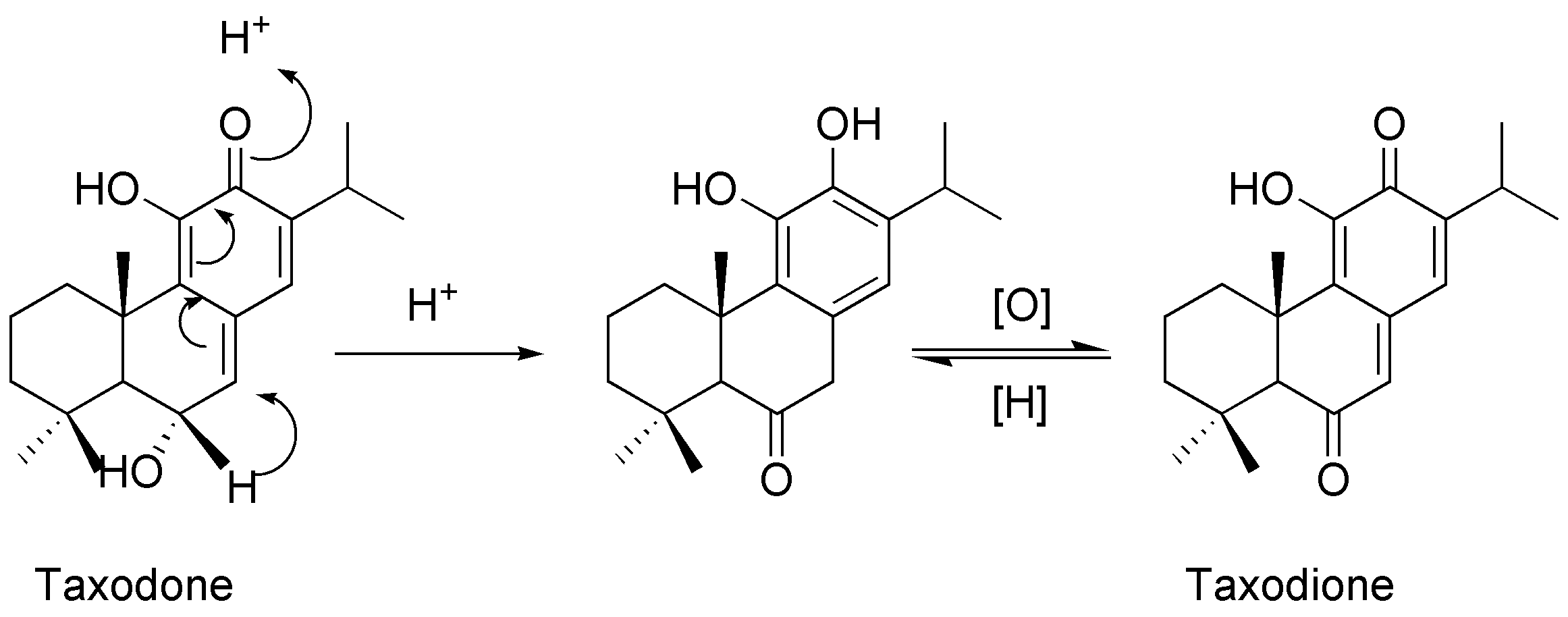
Conversion of taxodone into taxodione

- Maytenoquinone, an isomer of taxodione, is found in Maytenus dispermus.
- Kendomycin is a quinone methide macrolide first isolated from the bacterium Streptomyces violaceoruber.
- Elansolid A3 is a quinone methide from the bacterium Chitinophaga sancti.
- Quinone methides 20-epi-isoiguesterinol, 6-oxoisoiguesterin, isoiguesterin, and isoiguesterinol were found in Salacia madagascariensis.
- Quinone methides tingenone and netzahualcoyonol were isolated from Salacia petenensis.
- Nortriterpenoid quinone methides amazoquinone and (7S, 8S)-7-hydroxy-7,8-dihydro-tingenone were isolated from Maytenus amazonica. An antimicrobial quinone methide, 15 alpha-hydroxypristimerin, was isolated from a South American medicinal plant, Maytenus scutioides.

== Quinone dimethides ==
A quinone dimethide (or "xylylene") is a compound with the formula C_{6}H_{4}(=CH_{2})_{2}. Thus they are related to quinone monomethides (the topic of this article) by replacing the keto group with methylidene. A well studied example is tetracyanoquinodimethane.
