= Red plum =

Red plum can refer to:

- Endiandra introrsa, a tree commonly known as Red Plum
- Valassis, a company that markets itself using the name Redplum
