= Carpanone =

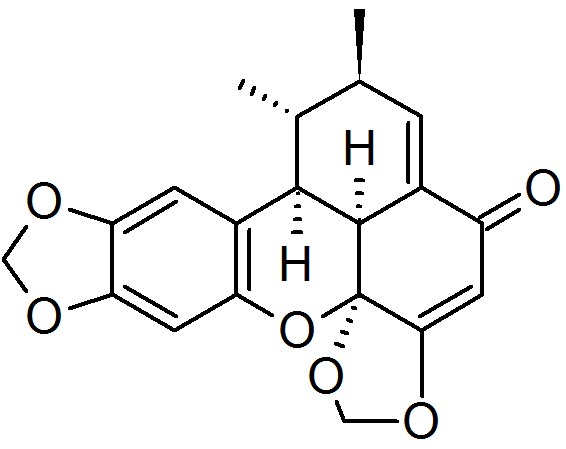

Names
- Other names Cupanone

Identifiers
CAS Number	26430-30-8
3D model (JSmol)	Interactive image
ChemSpider	21864720
PubChem CID	291296
UNII	G32K37Q6T4
CompTox Dashboard (EPA)	DTXSID10303059
- InChI: InChI=1S/C20H18O6/c1-9-3-11-13(21)5-17-20(25-8-24-17)19(11)18(10(9)2)12-4-15-16(23-7-22-15)6-14(12)26-20/h3-6,9-10,18-19H,7-8H2,1-2H3/t9-,10+,18+,19+,20?/m0/s1 Key: WTXORUUTAZJKSN-JMAAQRFFSA-N; InChI=1/C20H18O6/c1-9-3-11-13(21)5-17-20(25-8-24-17)19(11)18(10(9)2)12-4-15-16(23-7-22-15)6-14(12)26-20/h3-6,9-10,18-19H,7-8H2,1-2H3/t9-,10+,18+,19+,20?/m0/s1 Key: WTXORUUTAZJKSN-JMAAQRFFBX
- SMILES: CC1C=C2C3C(C1C)c4cc5c(cc4OC36C(=CC2=O)OCO6)OCO5

Properties
Chemical formula	C_{20}H_{18}O_{6}
Molar mass	354.343 g/mol
- Except where otherwise noted, data are given for materials in their standard state (at 25 °C [77 °F], 100 kPa). verify (what is ?) Infobox references

Carpanone is a naturally occurring lignan-type natural product most widely known for the remarkably complex way nature prepares it, and the similarly remarkable success that an early chemistry group, that of Orville L. Chapman, had at mimicking nature's pathway. Carpanone is an organic compound first isolated from the carpano trees (Cinnamomum sp.) of Bougainville Island by Brophy and coworkers, trees from which the natural product derives its name. The hexacyclic lignan is one of a class of related diastereomers isolated from carpano bark as mixtures of equal proportion of the "handedness" of its components (i.e., racemic mixtures), and is notable in its stereochemical complexity, because it contains five contiguous stereogenic centers. The route by which this complex structure is achieved through biosynthesis involves a series of reactions that, almost instantly, take a molecule with little three-dimensionality to the complex final structure. Notably, Brophy and coworkers isolated the simpler carpacin, a phenylpropanoid with a 9-carbon framework, recognized its substructure as being dimerized within the complex carpanone structure, and proposed a hypothesis of how carpacin was converted to carpanone in plant cells:

Carpacin, an ortho-methoxystyrene, and a more common type of phenolic plant phenylpropanoid whose structure was recognized as being dimerized in carpanone

- carpacin underwent loss of a methyl (-CH_{3}) group from the ring methoxy (-OCH_{3}) group to provide the phenol, desmethylcarpacin,
- this phenol intermediate then underwent a phenolic coupling to generate a dimeric intermediate, which was
- followed immediately by a Diels-Alder (4+2) cycloaddition reaction to create 2 new rings, to give the final carpanone product.

Remarkably, within two years, Chapman and coworkers were able to chemically design a route to mimic this proposed biosynthetic route, and achieved the synthesis of carpanone from carpacin in a single "pot", in about 50% yield.

Carpanone itself is limited in its pharmacologic and biologic activities, but related analogs arrived at by variations of the Brophy-Chapman approach have shown activities as tool compounds relevant to mammalian exocytosis and vesicular traffic, and provided therapeutic "hits" in antiinfective, antihypertensive, and hepatoprotective areas.

The original Chapman design and synthesis is considered a classic in total synthesis, and one that highlights the power of biomimetic synthesis.

== Total synthesis ==
The first total synthesis of carpanone was the biomimetic approach published by Chapman et al. in 1971. The required desmethylcarpacin (2-allylsesamol), shown below as the starting molecule in the scheme, is acquired in two high-yield steps involving three transformations:

- allylation of the phenolic anion generated after treatment of sesamol with potassium carbonate and allyl bromide,
- followed by a thermal Claisen rearrangement to move the O-allyl group onto the adjacent site on the aromatic ring, and then
- thermal isomerization of the Claisen product, to move the terminal olefin (alkene) into conjugation with the ring (with e.g., potassium tert-butoxide as base).

This procedure is one of several that gives the required desmethylcarpacin (carpacin with the methyl of its methoxy group removed). Though oxidative dimerizations of phenols normally used a 1-electron oxidant, Chapman then followed a precedent involving a 2-electron oxidant and treated desmethylcarpacin with PdCl_{2} in the presence of sodium acetate (e.g., dissolved in a mixture of methanol and water); the reaction was perceived to proceed via a complexation of a pair of carpacins to the Pd(II) metal via their phenolic anions (as shown in scheme, below right), followed by a classic 8-8' (β-β') oxidative phenolic coupling of the two olefin tails—shown crossing in the image—to give a dimeric trans-ortho-quinone methide-type of lignan intermediate. A particular conformation of this dimer then places a 4-electron enone of one ring over the 2-electron enol of the other (shown adjacent in image for clarity), setting the state for a variant of the Diels-Alder reaction termed an inverse demand Diels-Alder reaction (see curved arrows in image), which closes the 2 new rings and generates the 5 contiguous stereocenters. The carpanone is produced in yields of ≈50% by the original method, and in yields >90% in modern variants (see below). The synthesis of a single diastereomer was confirmed in the original Chapman work, using X-ray crystallography.

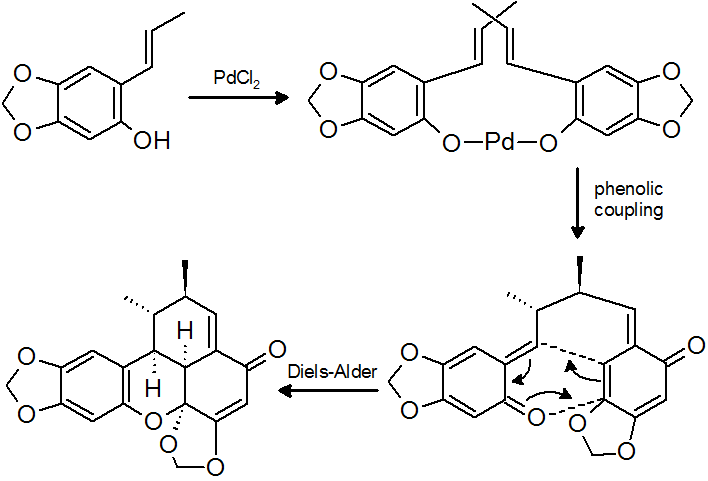
Biomimetic transformation of desmethylcarpacin into carpanone in one pot, via a tandem oxidative coupling–Diels Alder reaction sequence. Note, in the second image in the scheme, the two lines crossing at the top are the two molecules overlapping each other (and do not imply chemical bonds). In this scheme, Pd (II) is shown forming a complex between two monomers of carpacin, then mediating oxidative 8-8' (β-β') phenolic coupling of their alkene tails to generate a dimer, a trans-ortho-quinone methide intermediate, followed immediately by an endo-selective inverse electron-demand hetero-Diels-Alder reaction (see Diels–Alder reaction#Mechanism), to close the rings and generates the stereocenters.

For the elegance of its "one-pot construction of a tetracyclic scaffold with complete stereocontrol of five contiguous stereo centers", the original Chapman design and synthesis is "[n]ow considered a classic in total synthesis" that "highlights the power of biomimetic synthesis".

== Extensions of the system ==
The Chapman approach has been applied in a variety of ways since its original report, varying substrates, oxidants, and other aspects (and so synthesis of carpanone has subsequently been achieved by "quite a few research groups"); the actual mechanism of Pd(II) action is likely more complex than the original conjecture, and there is evidence that the mechanism, broadly speaking, depends on actual conditions (specific substrate, oxidant, etc.). Various groups, including the laboratories of Steve Ley, Craig Lindley, and Matthew Shair, have succeeded in extending the Chapman method to solid-supported synthesis, i.e., phenolic starting materials on polymeric supports, thus allowing the generation of libraries of carpanone analogs. A hetero-8-8' oxidative coupling system akin to the Chapman approach has been developed that uses IPh(OAC)_{2}, and that allows for preparation of more electron rich homodimers, and for hetero-tetracyclic analogs of carpanone.
