= Dorrigo =

Dorrigo is a place in New South Wales, Australia; it may refer to:

- Dorrigo Plateau, Northern Tablelands
- Dorrigo, New South Wales, town on the Dorrigo Plateau
- Dorrigo National Park, on the Dorrigo Plateau
- Dorrigo railway line, largely defunct railway line terminating at Dorrigo
- Dorrigo Steam Railway and Museum, privately owned collection of railway equipment
- Dorrigo Pepper (Tasmannia stipitata), rainforest shrub
- Dorrigo Plum (Endiandra introrsa), rainforest tree
