= Carpacin =

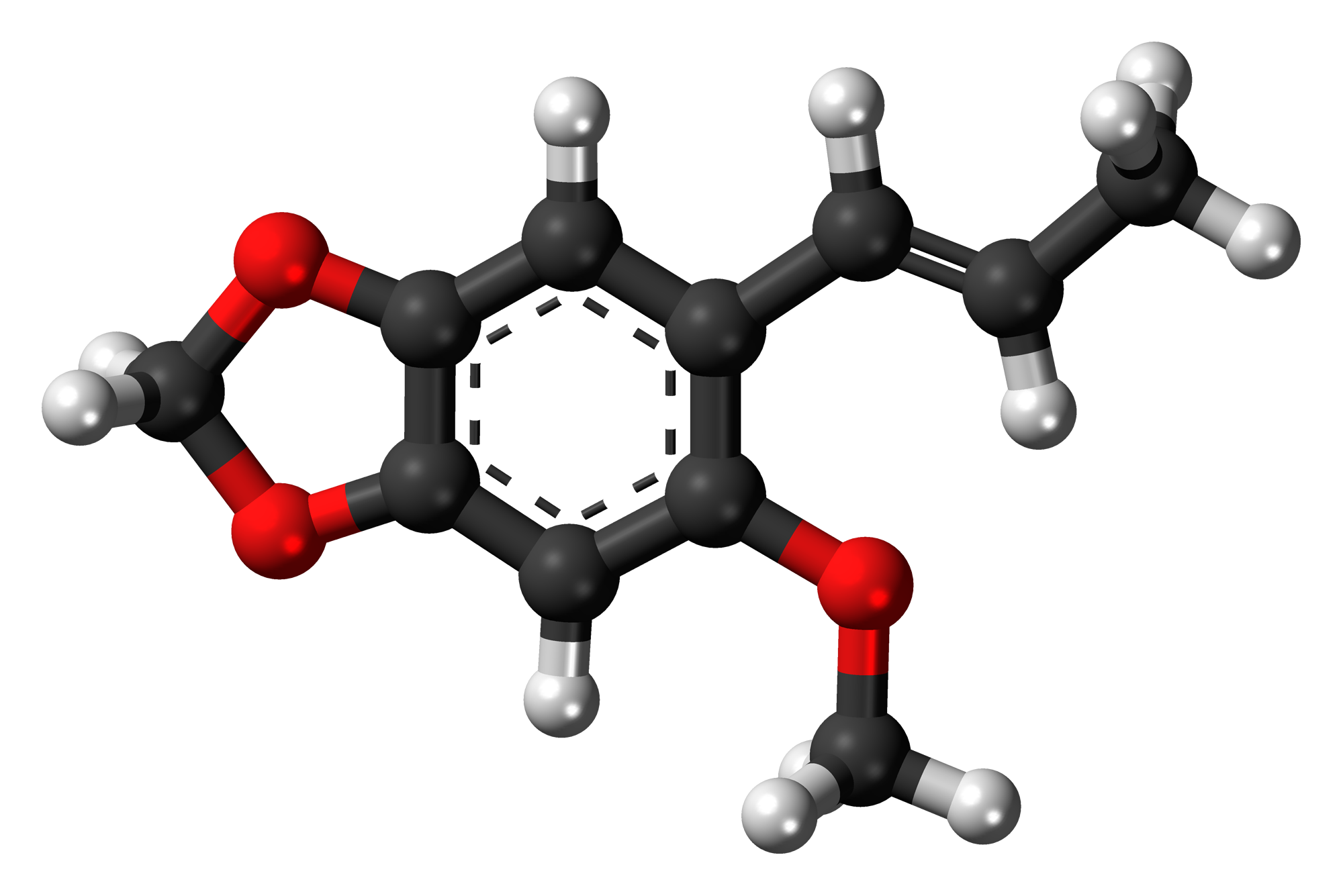

Names
- Preferred IUPAC name 5-Methoxy-6-[(E)-prop-1-enyl]-2H-1,3-benzodioxole
- Other names (E)-5-Methoxy-6-(prop-1-en-1-yl)benzo[d][1,3]dioxole (E)-2-Methoxy-4,5-methylenedioxypropenylbenzene

Identifiers
CAS Number	194605-01-1; 56767-00-1 (non-specific)
3D model (JSmol)	Interactive image; Interactive image
ChemSpider	4445077
PubChem CID	5281763
UNII	Z52RCE6A8B
CompTox Dashboard (EPA)	DTXSID801027180
- InChI: InChI=1S/C11H12O3/c1-3-4-8-5-10-11(14-7-13-10)6-9(8)12-2/h3-6H,7H2,1-2H3/b4-3+ Key: OTRFVHWXENKCEG-ONEGZZNKSA-N; InChI=1/C11H12O3/c1-3-4-8-5-10-11(14-7-13-10)6-9(8)12-2/h3-6H,7H2,1-2H3/b4-3+ Key: OTRFVHWXENKCEG-ONEGZZNKBF
- SMILES: C/C=C/C1=CC(OCO2)=C2C=C1OC; O1c2cc(c(OC)cc2OC1)/C=C/C

Properties
Chemical formula	C_{11}H_{12}O_{3}
Molar mass	192.214 g·mol^{−1}
- Except where otherwise noted, data are given for materials in their standard state (at 25 °C [77 °F], 100 kPa). verify (what is ?) Infobox references

Carpacin is a naturally occurring organic compound first isolated from the Carpano tree (an unidentified Cinnamomum species of the family Lauraceae which is native to Bougainville Island), from which it derives its name. It is also found in essential oils of the genus Crowea.

Carpacin is a biosynthetic precursor of the more complex lignan-dimer, carpanone. It is classified as a phenylpropanoid.

Carpacin has been prepared synthetically from sesamol and has been studied for potential use as an insecticide and inhibitor of carcinogenesis.

== See also ==
- PiHKAL § Essential amphetamines
