= Endiandric acid C =

Names
- IUPAC name (2R,3R,4S,5S,7S,8R)-4-[(2E,4E)-5-Phenyl-2,4-pentadien-1-yl]tetracyclo[5.4.0.0^{2,5}.0^{3,9}]undec-10-ene-8-carboxylic acid

Identifiers
CAS Number	76060-34-9
3D model (JSmol)	Interactive image
ChemSpider	16736127
PubChem CID	20055088
UNII	J7E8Q0ROAR
CompTox Dashboard (EPA)	DTXSID40601959
- InChI: InChI=1S/C23H24O2/c24-23(25)22-17-12-11-16-19(22)13-18-15(20(17)21(16)18)10-6-2-5-9-14-7-3-1-4-8-14/h1-9,11-12,15-22H,10,13H2,(H,24,25)/b6-2+,9-5+/t15-,16?,17?,18?,19-,20-,21-,22-/m0/s1
- SMILES: OC(=O)[C@H]5C2\C=C/C3[C@@H]5CC4[C@H](C\C=C\C=C\c1ccccc1)[C@@H]2[C@@H]34

Properties
Chemical formula	C_{23}H_{24}O_{2}
Molar mass	332.443 g·mol^{−1}
- Except where otherwise noted, data are given for materials in their standard state (at 25 °C [77 °F], 100 kPa). Infobox references

Endiandric acid C, isolated from the tree Endiandra introrsa, is a well characterized chemical compound. Endiadric acid C is reported to have better antibiotic activity than ampicillin.

This genus of trees is in the family Lauraceae. These trees are found in the north-eastern Australian rainforests and other tropical and subtropical regions. However, they are also found in southern Canada and in Chile. Endiandric acid C is also isolated from the species E. xanthocarpa. Endiandric acids are also found in Beilschmiedia trees, which were categorized under the genus Endiandra, but moved to their own genus as they found in cold, high latitude areas, and even in New Zealand. Other endiandric acids are found in B. oligandra and B. anacardioides, which are found in the Western Province of Cameroon.

== Bioactivity ==
This compound has the best antibacterial activity of Endiandrianic acid A-G compounds. Endiandric acid C was tested towards five strains of bacteria, which included Bacillus subtilis, Micococcus luteus, Streptococcus faecalis, Pseudomonas palida, and Escherichia coli through examining zone inhibition and minimum concentration, which was found to range between 0.24 μg/mL and 500 μg/mL. Endiandric acid C has also been used to cure uterine tumors, rubella, and female genital infections, and rheumatisms.

== Biosynthesis ==
Proposed course of reactions in nature, resulting in endiandric acid C.

Many biochemists predicted when examining K. C. Nicolaou's biomimetic synthesis of the endiandric acid cascade that enzymes aided this reaction in the biosynthesis. The biomimetic series determined that this process took place synthetically through a series of Diels-Alder cyclization reactions and therefore led researches to believe that Diels-Alderase assisted the formation of endiandric acid C.

Although it has been discovered since then that many famous cyclization reactions like that of lovastatin do result from the Diels-Alderase they have determine that the endiandric acid cascade does not involve enzymes but rather spontaneously undergoes ring formation from a derivative of bisnoryangonin 5, which results from both the shikimate and acetic pathways. The 4-hydroxycinnamoyl-CoA, compound 2, is the precursor that comes from the shikimate pathway. Two units of malonyl CoA are then added to through the acetate pathway 3. Compound 3 is then reduced to the di-enol form that tautomerizes to give the bisnoryangonin 5. A small amount of compound 5 can be isolated, however S-adenosyl methionine methylates most of it and gives yangonin 6. It has been proposed that a bisnoryangonin derivative 7, is then reduced by dehydrogenase to give the polyene precursor 8, that goes through spontaneous 8π conrotatory, 6π disrotatory, and [4+2] cyclization reactions to form endiandric acid C. This proposal is supported by the fact that endiandric acids naturally occur as racemic mixtures and not in an enantiomerically pure form, which should happen if enzymes mediate this process. The Diels-Alder reaction itself is a powerful reaction that can give cyclic compounds with many stereogenic centers.

Reaction sequence accounting for precursor of the tetraene structure required for biosynthesis of endiandric acids.

== Biomimetic total synthesis ==
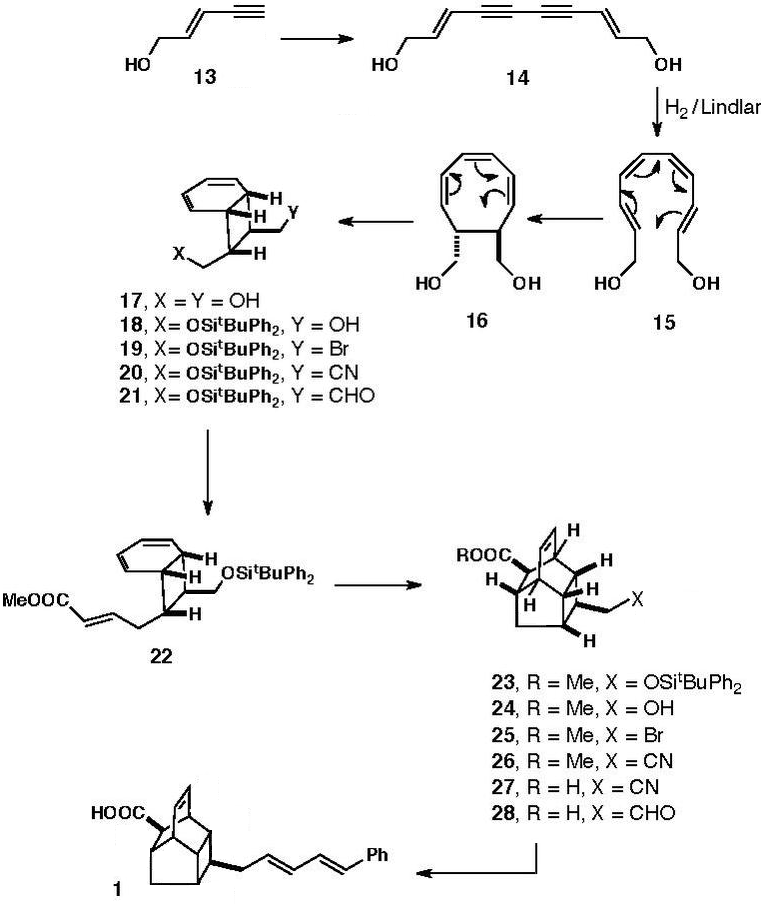
Reaction sequence in Nicolaou's 1982 biomimetic total synthesis of endiandric acid C.

K. C. Nicolaou's group successfully synthesized endiandric acid, 1, in 1982 as a test of Black's biosynthetic conjecture, using a biomimetic strategy involving series of stereocontrolled electrocyclic reactions. Specifically, they observed that the natural products endiandric acids A and C could have arisen from a common precursor, via slightly different 6π [4s+2s] cycloaddition (Diels-Alder) reactions. This key precursor was in turn accessible biosynthetically via two further thermally allowed sequential 6π electron and 8π electron electrocyclizations.

The Nicolaou group therefore sought to synthesize endiandric acid C from an acyclic symmetric diacetylenic diol precursor, 14 (as shown); they began with "mild hydrogenation" in the presence of Lindlar catalyst and quinoline, anticipating tetraene diol 15, cyclooctatriene 16, or the fully cyclized bicyclo[4.2.0]octadiene (bicyclic diol) 17. Remarkably, following this 3-6 hour, 25 °C process, a 45-55% yield of bicyclic diol 17 could be isolated. Hence, it was not necessary to do anything specific to promote the required sequence of 8π conrotatory and 6π disrotatory cyclizations (further highlighted in supplementary image); they occurred spontaneously on generation of tetraene-diol 15. Protection of a single alcohol moiety (as TBDPS) was accomplished using the silyl chloride via the corresponding tricyclic iodoether intermediate (not shown), with the internally masked remaining hydroxyl group being released on treatment with zinc dust in acetic acid (giving 18 in 70-80% yield). Bromination of the alcohol under Appel conditions followed by its displacement on treatment with sodium cyanide in HMPA gave nitrile 20, the key intermediate in all of this group's endiandric acid syntheses.

The title compound was then pursued via DIBAL reduction of the nitrile at low temperature, followed by mild acidic hydrolysis to release aldehyde 21. A series of 7 further steps—condensation to form trans-butenoate 22, thermal intramolecular Diels-Alder reaction to create the tetracyclic endiantric core structure 23, desilylation to unmask alcohol 24, bromination and nitrile formation (as described above) to give 25 and 26, respectively, then hydrolysis of the methyl ester and repeat of the earlier DIBAL/acid hydrolysis sequence—generated the endiantric core structure with pendant aldehyde, 28, that was poised for the final step. Its treatment with diethyl cinnamylphosphonate and LDA at low temperature in THF (generating en route the anionic olefination reagent) formed the desired diene in good yield in a "geometrically controlled manner", thus providing the desired endiandric acid C product.

Initial electrocyclizations in Nicolaou endiandric acid C synthesis, to provide diol 17 shown in the main scheme. This key intermediate is then ready for elaboration into the olefin which can undergo the further 6π[4+2] (Diels-Alder) cycloaddition reaction shown in the main scheme, to provide the title natural product.
