= Biomimetic synthesis =

Biomimetic synthesis is an area of organic chemical synthesis that is specifically biologically inspired. The term encompasses both the testing of a "biogenetic hypothesis" (conjectured course of a biosynthesis in nature) through execution of a series of reactions designed to parallel the proposed biosynthesis, as well as programs of study where a synthetic reaction or reactions aimed at a desired synthetic goal are designed to mimic one or more known enzymic transformations of an established biosynthetic pathway. The earliest generally cited example of a biomimetic synthesis is Sir Robert Robinson's organic synthesis of the alkaloid tropinone.

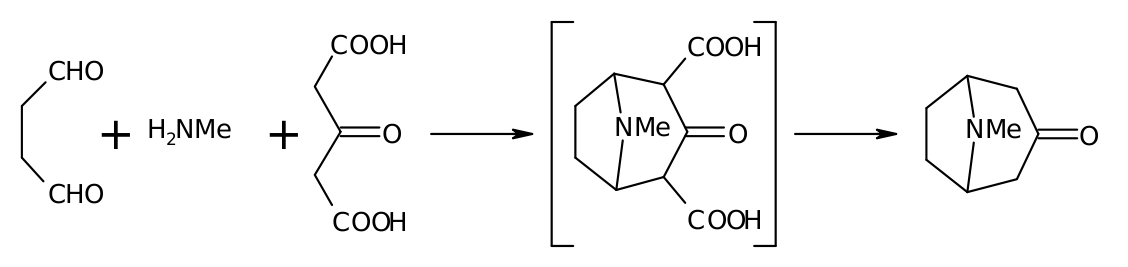

A more recent example is E.J. Corey's carbenium-mediated cyclization of an engineered linear polyene to provide a tetracyclic steroid ring system, which built upon studies of cationic cyclizations of linear polyenes by the Albert Eschenmoser and Gilbert Stork, and the extensive studies of the W.S. Johnson to define the requirements to initiate and terminate the cyclization, and to stabilize the cationic carbenium group during the cyclization (as nature accomplishes via enzymes during biosynthesis of steroids such as cholesterol). In relation to the second definition, synthetic organic or inorganic catalysts applied to accomplish a chemical transformation accomplished in nature by a biocatalyst (e.g., a purely proteinaceous catalyst, a metal or other cofactor bound to an enzyme, or a ribozyme) can be said to be accomplishing a biomimetic synthesis, where design and characterization of such catalytic systems has been termed biomimetic chemistry.

== Synthesis of proto-daphniphylline ==
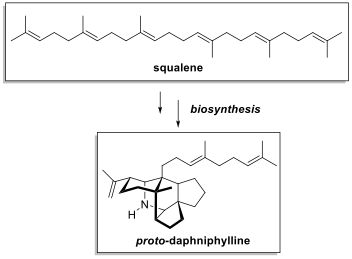
Proto-Daphniphylline is biosynthesized from squalene

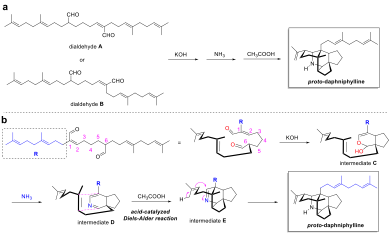
(a) Key precursors A and B for the synthesis of proto-daphniphylline. (b) Mechanisms for converting dialdehyde A to proto-daphniphylline.

Proto-daphniphylline is a precursor in the biosynthesis of a family of alkaloids found in Daphniphyllum macropodum. It is of interest due to its complex molecular structure making it a challenging target for conventional organic synthesis methods due to the fused ring structure and the spiro carbon centre. Based on a proposed biosynthesis pathway of proto-daphniphylline from squalene, Clayton Heathcock and co-workers developed a remarkably elegant and short total synthesis of proto-daphniphylline from simple starting materials. This is an example of how biomimetic synthesis can simplify the total synthesis of a complex natural product.

The key step in Heathcock's synthetic route involves a cyclization of acyclic dialdehydes A or B to form proto-daphniphylline. Both dialdehydes (A or B) have carbon skeletons analogous to squalene and can be synthesized from simple starting materials. Treating A or B with a sequence of simple reagents containing potassium hydroxide, ammonia, and acetic acid led to the formation of proto-daphniphylline. Six σ-bonds and five rings were formed in this remarkable step. It was proposed in the original report that hydroxyldihydropyran intermediate C was first formed when the dialdehyde starting material (A) was treated with potassium hydroxide. A 2-aza-1, 3-diene intermediate (D) was generated from the reaction of intermediate C with ammonia. An acid-catalyzed Diels-Alder reaction formed intermediate E which was further converted to the final product under the reaction conditions.

== Examples of biomimetic syntheses ==
- carpanone, via the Chapman approach
- spirotryprostatin B, via the Ganesan approach
- endiandric acid, see Biomimetic Total synthesis, via Nicolaou approach

== Further literature examples of biomimetic syntheses ==
- Merck synthesis of nakiterpiosin-type C-nor-D-homosteroids, e.g., Structural: Cleaved, contracted, and expanded rings (seco-, nor-, and homosteroids), via C-13 atom migration
- Heathcock synthesis of squalene-derived daphniphylline-type alkaloids, via tetracyclization or pentacyclization cascades
