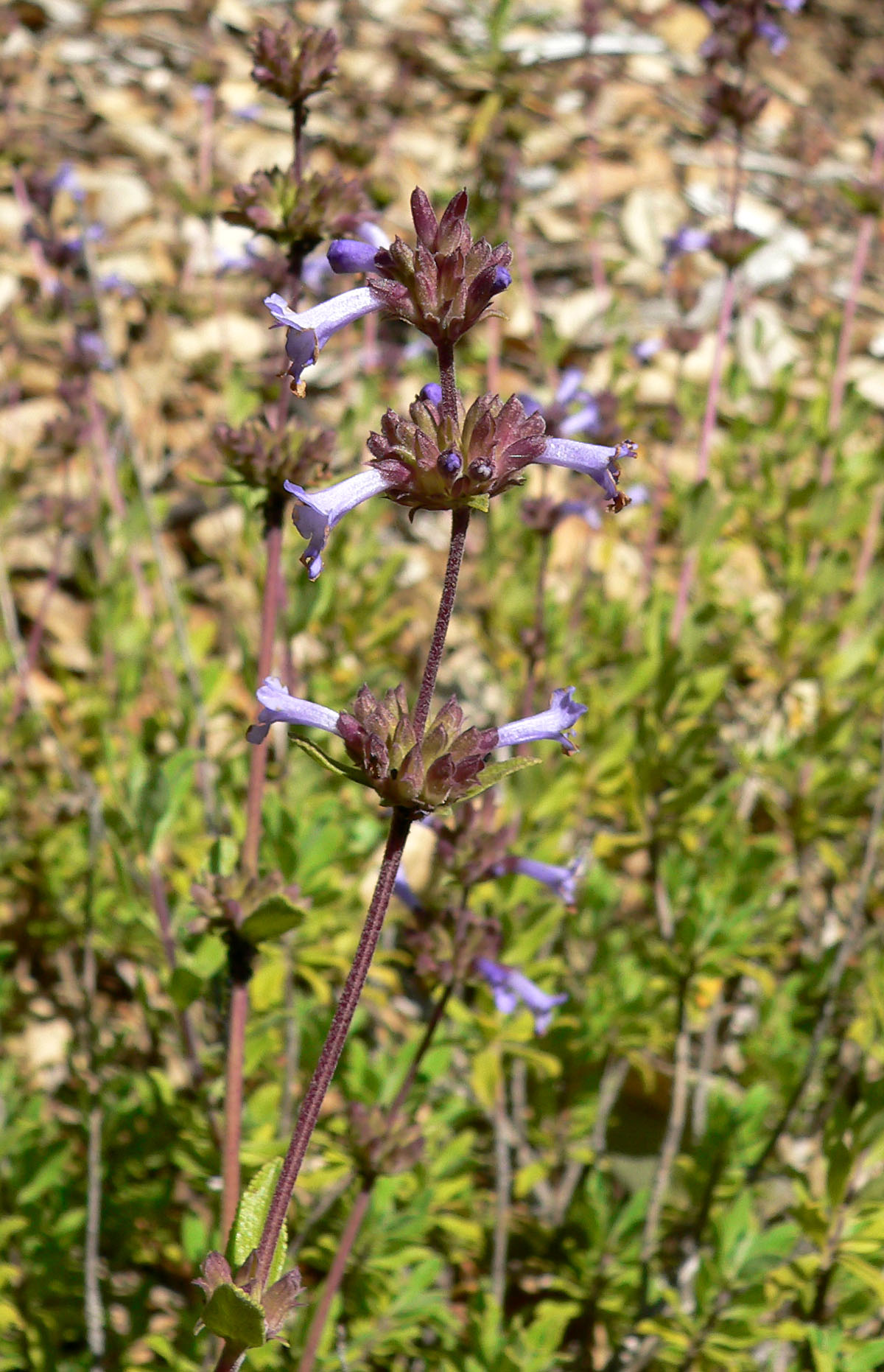

Conservation status
- Vulnerable (NatureServe)

Scientific classification
- Kingdom: Plantae
- Clade: Tracheophytes
- Clade: Angiosperms
- Clade: Eudicots
- Clade: Asterids
- Order: Lamiales
- Family: Lamiaceae
- Genus: Salvia
- Species: S. munzii

Binomial name
- Salvia munzii Epling, 1935

Synonyms
- Salvia mellifera var. jonesii Munz, 1927

= Salvia munzii =

Species of flowering plant

Salvia munzii is a semi-evergreen perennial species of sage known by the common name Munz's sage or San Miguel Mountain sage. It is native to northern Baja California, Mexico, and it can be found in a few locations just north of the border in San Diego County, California, where it is particularly rare. It is characterized by small leaves and clear blue flowers. It is a member of the coastal sage scrub and chaparral plant communities.

== Description ==
Salvia munzii is a bushy shrub that may exceed 2 metres (6.6 ft) in height, with its branches coated in hairs. The rough-textured leaves are up to 5 centimeters long, with their undersides densely hairy.

The erect inflorescences are made up of many interrupted clusters of flowers, each cluster subtended by a pair of lance-shaped, leaflike bracts. The flower has a tubular blue corolla up to 1.5 centimeters long. Flowering is from January to May.

== Taxonomy ==
This species was named in honor of the California botanist Philip A. Munz. It was described by Carl Epling in 1935, in the third issue of the journal Madroño, the type specimen collected from a small arroyo south of Hamilton Ranch, Baja California. Munz had previously classified a collection of this plant in 1927 as Salvia mellifera var. jonesii. Epling noted that Salvia munzii was not found growing in any locality in association with S. mellifera.

The chromosome number is 2n = 30.

=== Characteristics ===
It may be distinguished from S. mellifera by its more compact, rounded habit, the unbranched inflorescence, the more obovate-shaped leaves, and particularly by the shape of the corolla and stamens, with the corolla is also colored a uniformly darker blue than S. mellifera, rarely matching in color. S. munzii also flowers much earlier, as early as January. The odor of the plant most resembles Salvia clevelandii, which also shares similar foliage.

== Distribution and habitat ==
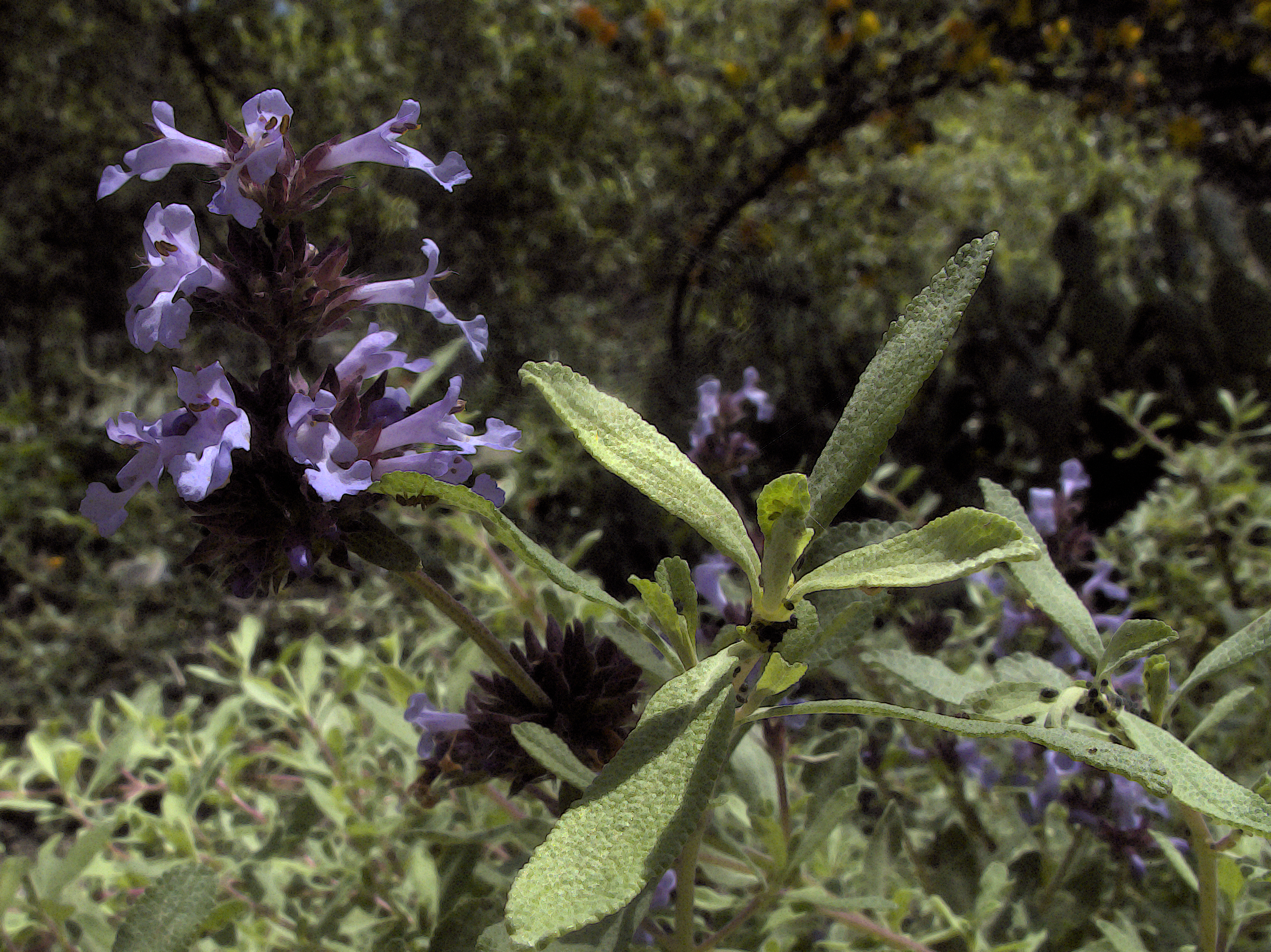
Flowering at the Regional Parks Botanical Garden in Berkeley, CA.

In Baja California, this shrub is common, and can be found sparsely from Tijuana south until Ensenada, where its distribution becomes more abundant, further south to the northern Central Desert region around the Boojum tree belt in El Rosario, and it extends about 25 miles inland. A voucher of this plant listed in the state of Sonora may be mislabeled and instead refers to the Sonoran Desert in Baja California; it is unclear if it occurs in the state of Sonora. In California, this plant is limited to the San Miguel Mountains of San Diego County, on public and private land.

This plant is generally found in chaparral and coastal scrub. This species most often grows in association with Artemisia californica, a co-dominant member of the coastal sage formation, and frequently with Salvia apiana.

== Conservation ==
This species is vulnerable to threats in Baja California but especially California, where it has a limited distribution. In San Diego County, it is primarily threatened by development, and by non-native plants (invasive plants), off-road vehicles, recreation, trampling, roads and illegal dumping. In Baja California, the threats may be similar.

== Cultivation ==
This plant is well-adapted for small gardens and perennial borders, and it also attracts hummingbirds and butterflies. Plants may look best if their tip is pruned continually, and watered once a month during summer. This species is tolerant of heavy soil, full sun, and is resistant to frost. The small leaves may create an interesting contrast with other sages.
