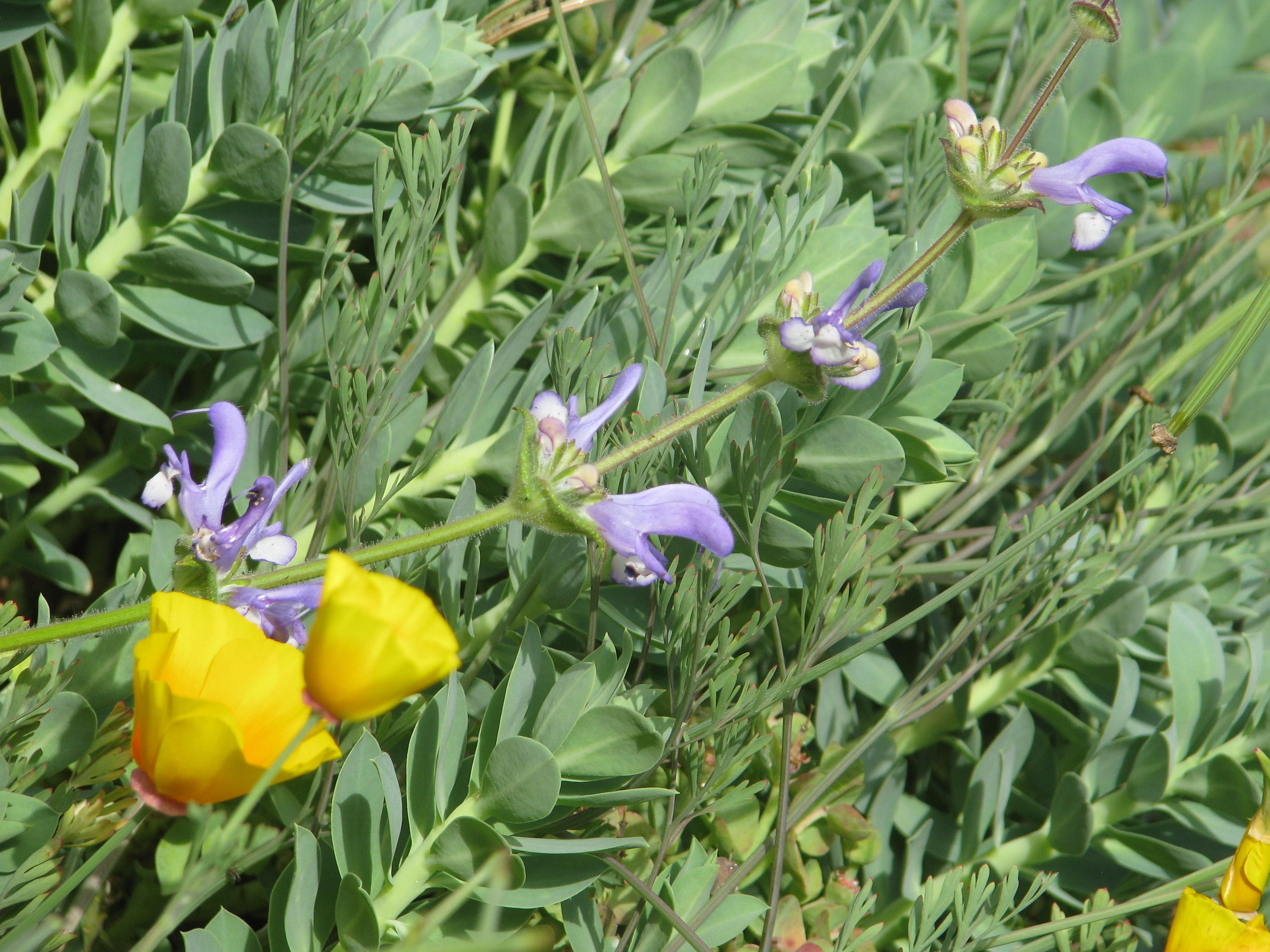

Scientific classification
- Kingdom: Plantae
- Clade: Tracheophytes
- Clade: Angiosperms
- Clade: Eudicots
- Clade: Asterids
- Order: Lamiales
- Family: Lamiaceae
- Genus: Salvia
- Species: S. hypargeia

Binomial name
- Salvia hypargeia Fich. & Mey.

= Salvia hypargeia =

Species of flowering plant

Salvia hypargeia is a herbaceous perennial native to Turkey.

Leaves are simple to simple basal, linear to linear-oblong, greenish on top and whitish on the underside. Flowers are arranged in verticelles, with 4–8 flowers per verticelle. The corolla is 2.5 to 3 cm (0.98 to 1.18 in) long with a lavender to purplish-blue upper lip, and a lavender to cream lower lip.
