= Kendomycin =

Names
- IUPAC name (1R,9S,10S,12S,14E,16S,19R,20R,21S,22R)-3,9,21-Trihydroxy-5,10,12,14,16,20,22-heptamethyl-23,24-dioxatetracyclo[17.3.1.1^{6,9}.0^{2,7}]tetracosa-2,5,7,14-tetraen-4-one
- Systematic IUPAC name (1R,9S,10S,12S,14E,16S,19R,20R,21S,22R)-3,9,21-Trihydroxy-5,10,12,14,16,20,22-heptamethyl-23,24-dioxatetracyclo[17.3.1.1^{6,9}.0^{2,7}]tetracosa-2,5,7,14-tetraen-4-one
- Other names (-)-TAN 2162

Identifiers
CAS Number	59785-91-0
3D model (JSmol)	Interactive image
ChEMBL	ChEMBL523927
ChemSpider	4582118
MeSH	C485395
PubChem CID	5472093
CompTox Dashboard (EPA)	DTXSID40420223
- InChI: InChI=1S/C29H42O6/c1-14-8-9-22-18(5)24(30)19(6)28(34-22)23-21-13-29(33,17(4)12-16(3)11-15(2)10-14)35-27(21)20(7)25(31)26(23)32/h10,13-14,16-19,22,24,28,30,32-33H,8-9,11-12H2,1-7H3/b15-10+/t14-,16+,17-,18-,19+,22+,24-,28+,29+/m0/s1 Key: HKLDUJXJTQJSEJ-OLXNOMCWSA-N; InChI=1/C29H42O6/c1-14-8-9-22-18(5)24(30)19(6)28(34-22)23-21-13-29(33,17(4)12-16(3)11-15(2)10-14)35-27(21)20(7)25(31)26(23)32/h10,13-14,16-19,22,24,28,30,32-33H,8-9,11-12H2,1-7H3/b15-10+/t14-,16+,17-,18-,19+,22+,24-,28+,29+/m0/s1 Key: HKLDUJXJTQJSEJ-OLXNOMCWBE
- SMILES: C[C@H]\1CC[C@@H]2[C@@H]([C@@H]([C@H]([C@@H](O2)C3=C(C(=O)C(=C4C3=C[C@@](O4)([C@H](C[C@@H](C/C(=C1)/C)C)C)O)C)O)C)O)C

Properties
Chemical formula	C_{29}H_{42}O_{6}
Molar mass	486.64 g/mol
Appearance	Yellow powder
Solubility in DMSO, methanol	Soluble

Hazards
- Occupational safety and health (OHS/OSH)
Main hazards	Toxic
- Except where otherwise noted, data are given for materials in their standard state (at 25 °C [77 °F], 100 kPa). verify (what is ?) Infobox references

Kendomycin is an anticancer macrolide first isolated from Streptomyces violaceoruber. It has potent activity as an endothelin receptor antagonist and anti-osteoporosis agent. It also has strong cytotoxicity against various tumor cell lines.

== Total synthesis ==
Because of its potent biological activities, kendomycin has attracted interest as a target of total synthesis. The first total synthesis of kendomycin was accomplished by Lee and Yuan in 2004. The total number of syntheses stands at 6.
