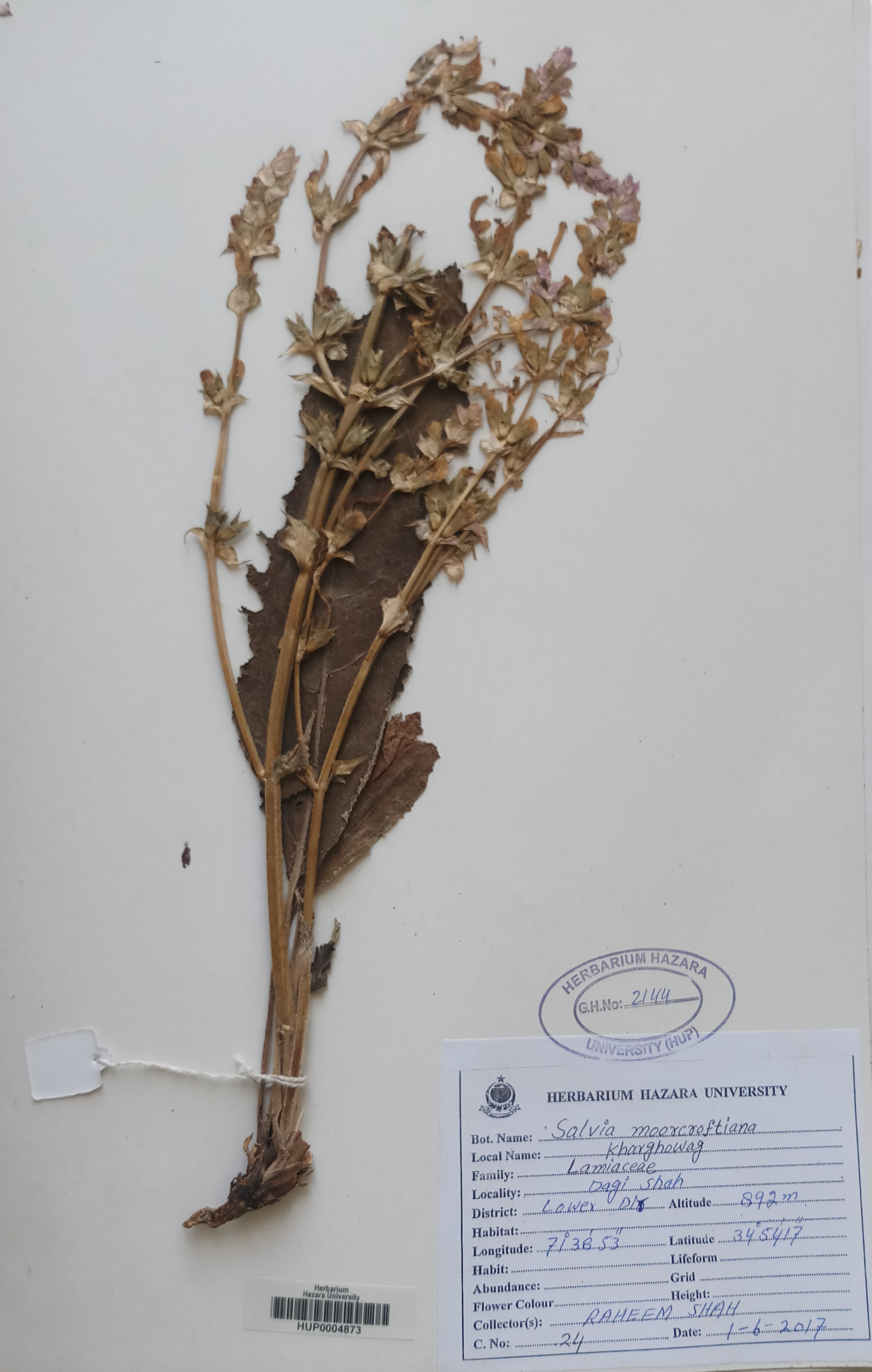

Scientific classification
- Kingdom: Plantae
- Clade: Tracheophytes
- Clade: Angiosperms
- Clade: Eudicots
- Clade: Asterids
- Order: Lamiales
- Family: Lamiaceae
- Genus: Salvia
- Species: S. moorcroftiana

Binomial name
- Salvia moorcroftiana Wall. ex Benth.

= Salvia moorcroftiana =

Species of plant

Salvia moorcroftiana is a herbaceous perennial native to the Himalayan mountains from Pakistan to western Nepal, and is especially common in the Kashmir Valley. It grows between 5,000 and 9,000 feet elevation on disturbed areas and open slopes. The leaves are used medicinally in Kashmir.

Salvia moorcroftiana grows to 2.5 feet tall, with large long-stemmed basal leaves with a toothed margin that appear to be covered with white wool. The 1-inch pale lilac flowers grow on many inflorescences that rise above the leaves. The flowers are held in a hairy calyx, with showy, green-veined, bracts adding to the plant's charm. In cultivation, it prefers full sun, loose soil, good drainage, and regular watering.

The plant also contains essential oil. [Manzoor A. Rather, Bilal A. Dar, Khursheed A. Bhat, Abdul S. Shawl, Mushtaq A. Qurishi, Mohd Yusuf Dar & Bashir A. Ganai (2011): Mono-sesquiterpenoid Composition in the Leaves and Flowers of Salvia moorcroftiana Wall ex Benth. Growing Wild in Kashmir, India, Journal of Essential Oil Research, 23:4, 21–25]
