= Streptomyces violaceoruber =

Scientific classification
- Domain: Bacteria
- Kingdom: Bacillati
- Phylum: Actinomycetota
- Class: Actinomycetes
- Order: Streptomycetales
- Family: Streptomycetaceae
- Genus: Streptomyces
- Species: S. violaceoruber

Binomial name
- Streptomyces violaceoruber Pridham 1970

Type strain
- ATCC 14980, ATCC 19816, ATCC 3355, BCRC 11489, CBS 569.68, CCRC 11489, CGMCC 4.1801, DSM 40049, ETH 14306, ICSSB 1016, IFO 12826, IMET 40270, IMRU 3030, ISP 5049, JCM 4423, KCC S-0423, KCCM 40150, KCTC 9787, LMG 20256, NBRC 12826, NRRL, NRRL B-12594, NRRL B-2935, NRRL B-3025, NRRL B-3319, NRRL-ISP 5049, RIA 1096, UNIQEM 203, VKM Ac-726, VTT E-991420, Waksman 3030, WC 3946

Synonyms
- "Actinomyces anthocyanicus" Krassilnikov et al. 1965; "Actinomyces coelescens" Krassilnikov et al. 1965; "Actinomyces roseodiastaticus" Duché 1934; "Actinomyces tricolor" Wollenweber 1920; "Actinomyces violaceolatus" Krassilnikov et al. 1965; "Actinomyces violaceusruber" Waksman and Curtis 1916; Actinopycnidium caeruleum Krassilnikov 1962 (Approved Lists 1980); Streptomyces anthocyanicus (Krassilnikov et al. 1965) Pridham 1970 (Approved Lists 1980); Streptomyces coelescens (Krassilnikov et al. 1965) Pridham 1970 (Approved Lists 1980); Streptomyces roseodiastaticus (Duché 1934) Waksman 1953 (Approved Lists 1980); Streptomyces tricolor (Wollenweber 1920) Waksman 1961 (Approved Lists 1980); Streptomyces violaceolatus (Krassilnikov et al. 1965) Pridham 1970 (Approved Lists 1980); Streptomyces violaceoruber (Waksman and Curtis 1916) Pridham 1970 (Approved Lists 1980)

Species of bacterium

Streptomyces violaceoruber is a bacterium species from the genus of Streptomyces. Streptomyces violaceoruber produces protoactinorhodin, kendomycin, phospholipase A2, granaticin and methylenomycin A.

== See also ==
- List of Streptomyces species
