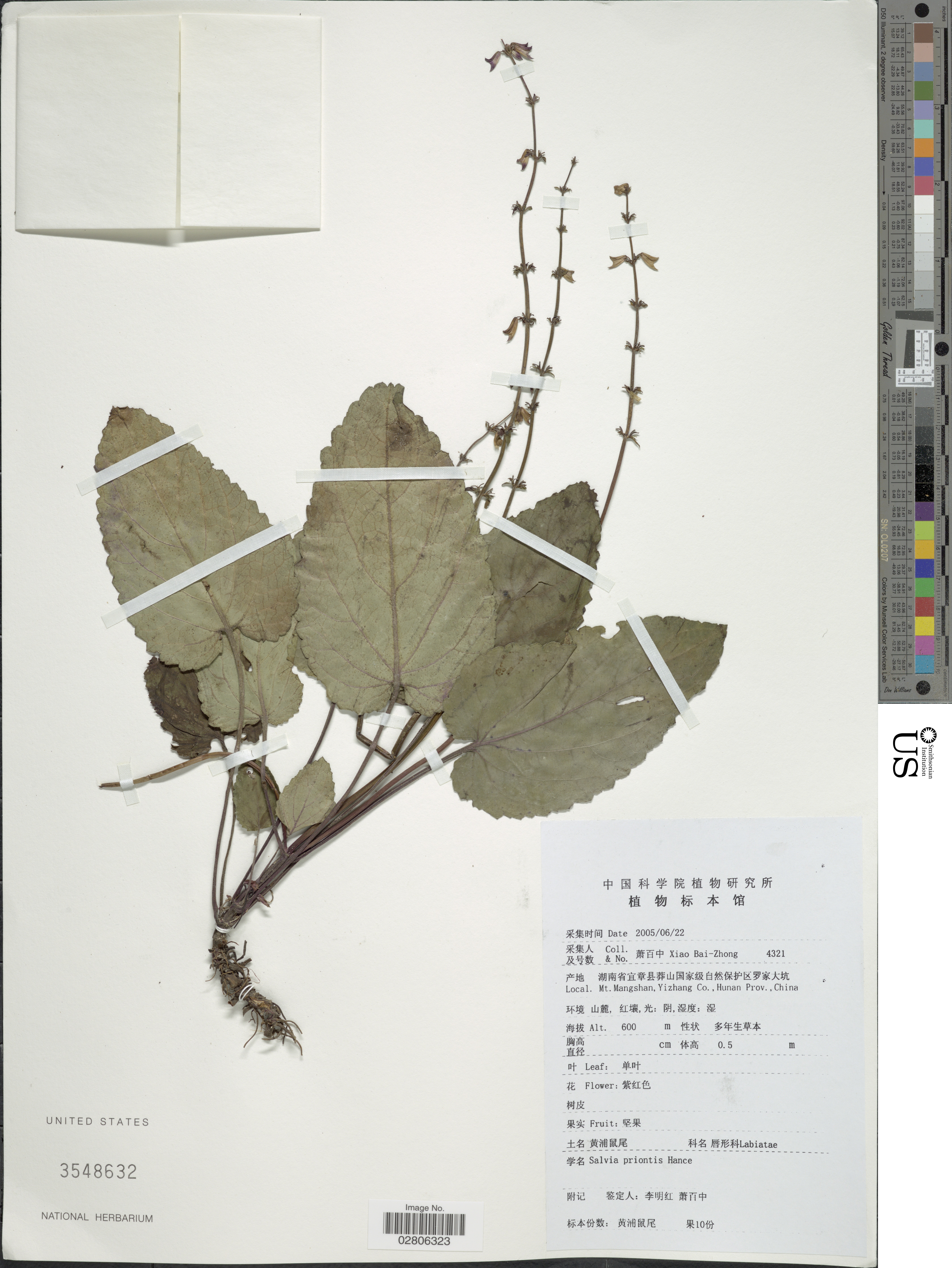

Scientific classification
- Kingdom: Plantae
- Clade: Tracheophytes
- Clade: Angiosperms
- Clade: Eudicots
- Clade: Asterids
- Order: Lamiales
- Family: Lamiaceae
- Genus: Salvia
- Species: S. prionitis

Binomial name
- Salvia prionitis Hance

= Salvia prionitis =

Species of herb

Salvia prionitis is an annual herb that is native to Anhui, Guangdong, Guangxi, Hunan, Jiangxi, and Zhejiang provinces in China, found growing on hillsides and grassy places at 100 to 800 m (330 to 2,620 ft) elevation. S. prionitis grows on erect stems 20 to 43 cm (7.9 to 16.9 in) tall, with mostly basal leaves. Inflorescences are widely spaced 6-14 flowered verticillasters in racemes or panicles, with a violet corolla.
