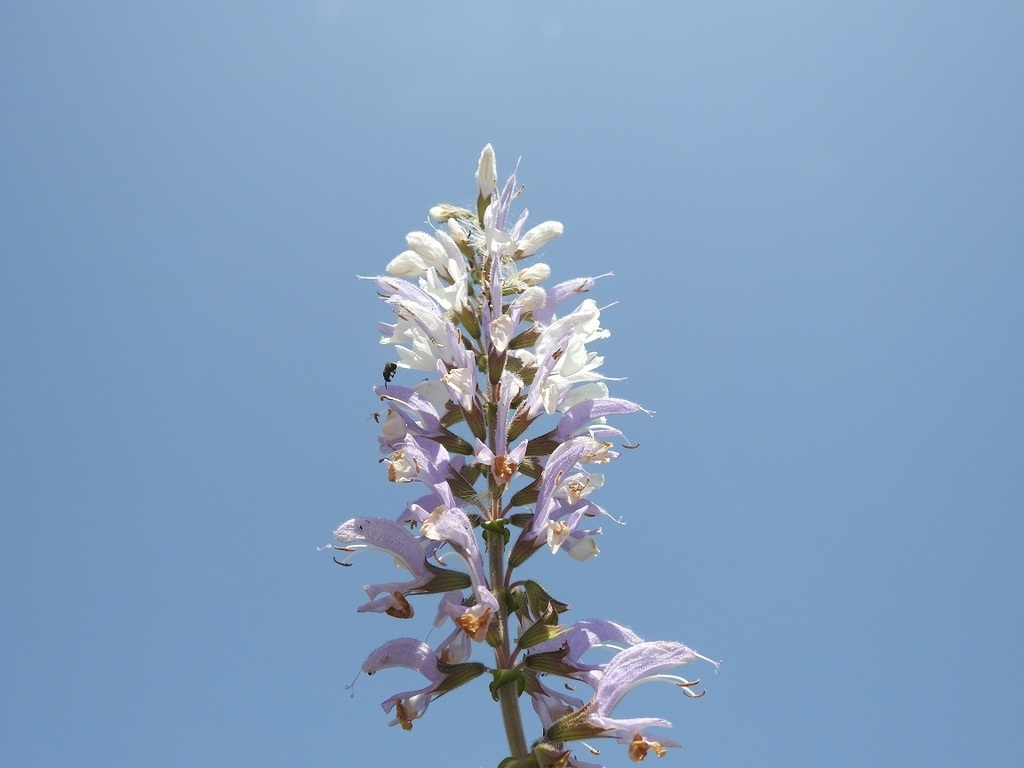

Scientific classification
- Kingdom: Plantae
- Clade: Tracheophytes
- Clade: Angiosperms
- Clade: Eudicots
- Clade: Asterids
- Order: Lamiales
- Family: Lamiaceae
- Genus: Salvia
- Species: S. barrelieri

Binomial name
- Salvia barrelieri Etlinger

= Salvia barrelieri =

Species of flowering plant

Salvia barrelieri (Berber clary) is a perennial found in northern Africa, Morocco, Tunisia, Algeria, and southwestern Spain, usually between the elevations of 500–1200 meters. It grows 1–2 meters tall, with large, wavy, gray-green leaves. The inflorescence is a verticillaster (See Inflorescence) and can grow nearly one meter tall, with flowers of light lavender or sky blue blooming all at the same time.
