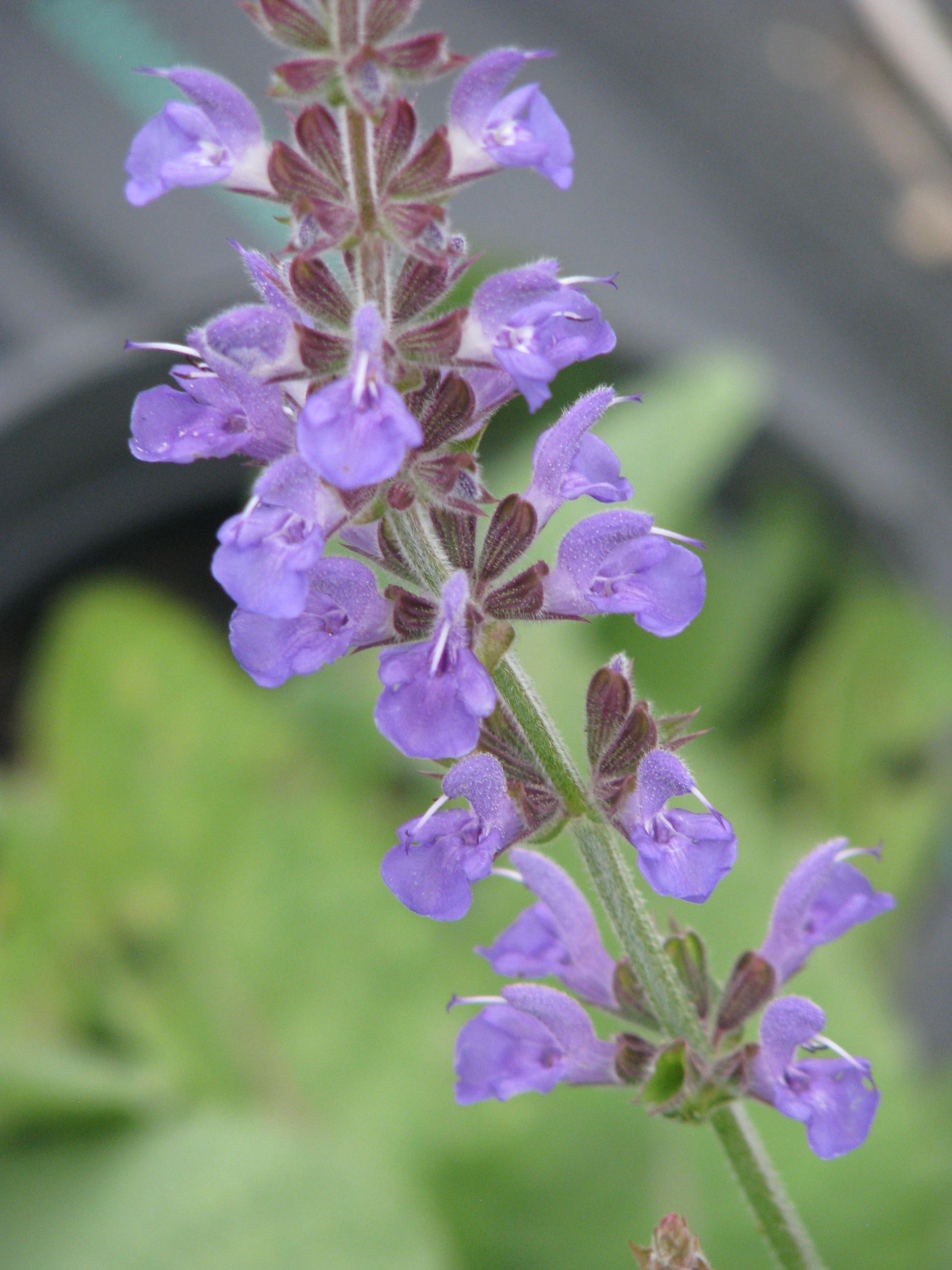

Scientific classification
- Kingdom: Plantae
- Clade: Tracheophytes
- Clade: Angiosperms
- Clade: Eudicots
- Clade: Asterids
- Order: Lamiales
- Family: Lamiaceae
- Genus: Salvia
- Species: S. deserta

Binomial name
- Salvia deserta Schangin

= Salvia deserta =

Species of plant

Salvia deserta (the Tartarian sage) is a perennial plant that is native to Xinjiang province in China, and the countries of Kazakhstan and Kyrgyzstan. It grows in wastelands, sandy grasslands, and along streams in forests at elevations from 300 to 1,800 m (980 to 5,910 ft).

Salvia deserta grows on erect stems to 70 cm (28 in) tall, with ovate to lanceolate-ovate leaves. Inflorescences are 4-6 flowered verticillasters in elongated terminal racemes or panicles, with a blue-purple to purple corolla that is 9 to 10 mm (0.35 to 0.39 in) long. It is very closely related to Salvia nemorosa, and is distinguished by having purple-red bracts.
