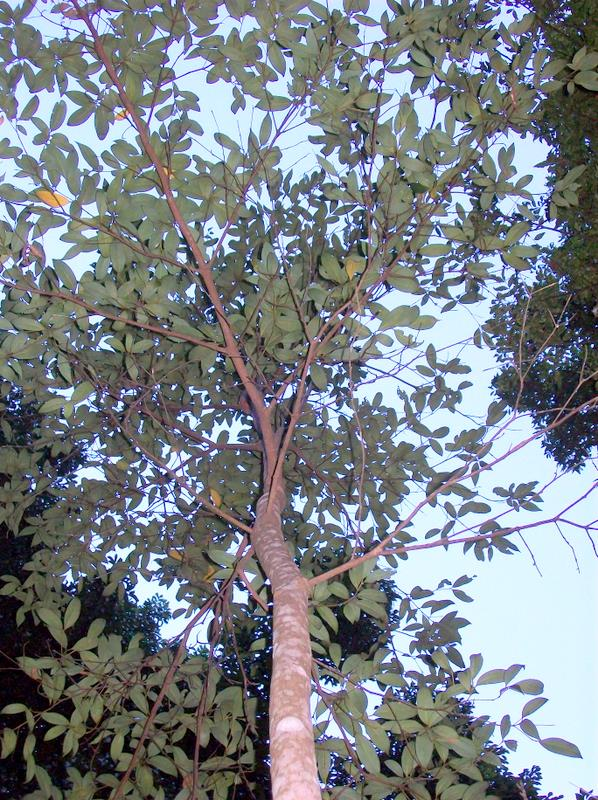

Conservation status
- Data Deficient (IUCN 3.1)

Scientific classification
- Kingdom: Plantae
- Clade: Tracheophytes
- Clade: Angiosperms
- Clade: Magnoliids
- Order: Laurales
- Family: Lauraceae
- Genus: Endiandra
- Species: E. introrsa

Binomial name
- Endiandra introrsa C.T.White

= Endiandra introrsa =

Dorrigo plum

Species of tree

Endiandra introrsa is a rare rainforest tree growing in eastern Australia. Listed with a Rare or Threatened Australian Plants (ROTAP) rating of 3RCa. Its habitat is a warm temperate rainforest on the poorer rainforest soils, mostly over 300 metres elevation, and its range of natural distribution is from near Dorrigo to various sites in the state of Queensland.

Common names include red plum, Dorrigo plum and red walnut, although the tree is neither a plum nor a walnut, but a laurel. The specific epithet "introrsa" refers to the openings of the flower anthers being on the inner side.

== Description ==
Endiandra introrsa is a tree reaching 40 metres tall with a trunk diameter of 90 cm. The base of the tree may be slightly buttressed and its trunk is cylindrical with some irregularities, bumps and depressions in the reddish brown bark. Its small branches are covered in downy hairs.

Its leaves are simple, alternate or rarely opposite on the stem, ovate-lanceolate in shape, 5 to 9 cm long and 1.5 to 3.5 cm wide, and glossy green above but waxy greyish below with a long blunt leaf tip. The leaf stem is between 10 and 12 mm long, and yellow leaf veins are evident above and below the leaf.

=== Flowers, fruit and regeneration ===
Small yellowish-green flowers form between October and November. The panicles are shorter than the leaves, which appear from the leaf axils.

The fruit matures in January to March, being a large fleshy drupe, 3 to 6 cm in diameter and fairly round in shape, though often being broader than deep. The colour is red, maturing to near black. It resembles a plum, hence the tree's common name. Inside is a single large seed. Removal of the flesh should be undertaken before planting the seed. Germination is slow but fairly reliable; it commences after around five or six months and is complete a few months later.

== Chemistry ==
Endiandric acid C, isolated from the Endiandra introrsa tree, is reported to have better antibiotic activity than ampicillin.
