= 4-Chlorobutyronitrile =

Names
- Preferred IUPAC name 4-Chlorobutanenitrile

Identifiers
CAS Number	628-20-6
3D model (JSmol)	Interactive image
ChemSpider	11831
ECHA InfoCard	100.010.029
EC Number	211-031-6
PubChem CID	12336
UNII	9JDK6275GP
CompTox Dashboard (EPA)	DTXSID0060850
- InChI: InChI=1S/C4H6ClN/c5-3-1-2-4-6/h1-3H2 Key: ZFCFBWSVQWGOJJ-UHFFFAOYSA-N
- SMILES: C(CC#N)CCl

Properties
Chemical formula	C_{4}H_{6}ClN
Molar mass	103.55 g·mol^{−1}
Appearance	colorless liquid
Density	1.0934 g/cm3 @15 °C
Boiling point	189–191 °C (372–376 °F; 462–464 K)

Hazards
- GHS labelling
Pictograms	(GHS06: Toxic) (GHS07: Exclamation mark)
Signal word	Danger
Hazard statements	H301, H315, H319, H335
Precautionary statements	P261, P264, P270, P271, P280, P301+P310, P302+P352, P304+P340, P305+P351+P338, P312, P321, P330, P332+P313, P337+P313, P362, P403+P233, P405, P501

Related compounds
Related compounds	3-Chloropropionitrile; Butyronitrile
- Except where otherwise noted, data are given for materials in their standard state (at 25 °C [77 °F], 100 kPa). Infobox references

4-Chlorobutyronitrile is the organic compound with the formula ClCH_{2}CH_{2}CH_{2}CN. With both chloro and cyano functional groups, it is a bifunctional molecule. It is a colorless liquid.

== Synthesis ==
Synthesis:

It is prepared by the reaction of potassium cyanide with 1-bromo-3-chloropropane.

Cyclopropyl cyanide is prepared by reaction of 4-chlorobutyronitrile with sodium amide in liquid ammonia. However an increased yield was reported when the base/solvent mixture was changed to NaOH/DMSO.

== Drug use ==
4-Chlorobutyronitrile is a precursor to the drugs buflomedil and buspirone.

== Precursor ==
Synthesis: Stereoselective:

4-Chlorobutyronitrile has been used as a starting material to prepare 2-phenylpyrrolidine. This in turn is a chief precursor to a family of compounds called pyrroloisoquinolines. These are valuable agents in medicinal chemistry that are endowed with BAT substrate reuptake inhibitor properties, elevating the synaptic concentration of serotonin and/or catecholamines. They therefore have application in the treatment of CNS diseases and eating disorders. A list of the known development codes includes the following: JNJ-7925476, McN5652, Mcn-5292, McN 5707, McN-5908, McN-4612, McN-5558, and McN-5847.

More recently, an alternative synthetic protocol was also reported by Maryanoff.
