= McN-4612 =

Clinical data
- Other names: Mcn 4612

Identifiers
- IUPAC name: 6-Phenyl-1,2,3,5,6,10b-hexahydropyrrolo[2,1-a]isoquinoline
- CAS Number: 87519-84-4
- PubChem CID: 135949
- ChemSpider: 119729
- ChEMBL: ChEMBL35184

Chemical and physical data
- Formula: C_{18}H_{19}N
- Molar mass: 249.357 g·mol^{−1}
- 3D model (JSmol): Interactive image
- SMILES: C1C[C@@H]2C3=CC=CC=C3[C@@H](CN2C1)C4=CC=CC=C4
- InChI: InChI=1S/C18H19N/c1-2-7-14(8-3-1)17-13-19-12-6-11-18(19)16-10-5-4-9-15(16)17/h1-5,7-10,17-18H,6,11-13H2/t17-,18+/m0/s1; Key:KJHWRRVSXANANB-ZWKOTPCHSA-N

McN-4612 is a noradrenaline-preferring serotonin–norepinephrine–dopamine reuptake inhibitor (SNDRI) developed by McNeil Laboratories in the 1980s.

== Pharmacology ==
Binding affinities (K_{i}) are reported to be the following (nM):

Compound	NE	DA	5-HT
racemic	0.6	11.3	23.5
McN 4612-z	0.37	4.4	12.4
McN-4612-Y	411	1345	4009

As can be seen nearly all of the Ki activity resides in a single optical antipode (or enantiomer). Hence, there is a good eudysmic ratio

While McN-4612-Y does not function as a positive reinforcer, according to the reference it might possibly have utility as an antipsychotic. It appears alongside McN-4171, which is an analog of butaclamol.

== Self-administration studies ==
Although McN-4612 was never publicly taken by humans, the self-administration by rats is reported in the literature.

== Analogs ==
McN-4612 is the lead compound in a series of agents and the antecedent to such agents as McN5652, McN 5707, JNJ-7925476, Mcn-5292, McN-5558, McN-5908 or McN-5847 for example. The SAR can be manipulated to place particular emphasis on catecholaminergic neurotransmission or to incorporate 5-HT into the pharmacophore. Some of these compounds are tremendously powerful agents. At the time of discovery, McN-5908 was the most powerful psychostimulant ever discovered, although it was claimed that it was also quite toxic. Only a few of the phenyltropanes are believed to have potencies that can rival this agent.

== Synthesis ==
A number of methods are available to synthesizing these agents in the appendant literature.

The first scheme relies on 2,2-diphenylethylamine, which itself is the product of the reduction of diphenylacetonitrile.

However, the 2-phenylpyrrolidine route is also attractive. Recently, an enantiomerically selective method was reported using this method of synthesis. It is worth noting that this compound is itself made from 4-chlorobutyronitrile.
