= C20H19N =

The molecular formula C_{20}H_{19}N (molar mass: 273.37 g/mol) may refer to:

- Dibenzylaniline
- JNJ-7925476
