= Cyclopropanes =

Cyclopropanes are a family of organic compounds containing the cyclopropyl group. The parent is cyclopropane (C_{3}H_{6}).

== Synthesis and reactions ==
Most cyclopropanes are not prepared from the parent cyclopropane, which is somewhat inert. Instead, cyclopropyl groups are often prepared by cyclization of 1,3-difunctional alkanes. An example of the former, cyclopropyl cyanide is prepared by the reaction of 4-chlorobutyronitrile with a strong base. Phenylcyclopropane is produced analogously from the 1,3-dibromide.

A second major route to cyclopropanes entails addition of methylene (or its substituted derivatives) to an alkene, a process called cyclopropanation.

Substituted cyclopropanes undergo the reactions associated with the cyclopropyl ring or the substituents. Vinylcyclopropanes are a special case as they undergo vinylcyclopropane rearrangement.

== Simple substituted cyclopropanes ==
- Chlorocyclopropane
- Cyclopropane carboxylic acid
- Cyclopropyl amine
- Cyclopropyl cyanide
- Cyclopropanol
- Methylenecyclopropane

== Applications and occurrence ==
(1R,3R)- or (+)-trans-chrysanthemic acid.

Cyclopropane derivatives are numerous. Many biomolecules and pharmaceutical drugs feature the cyclopropane ring. A famous example is aminocyclopropane carboxylic acid, which is the precursor to ethylene, a plant hormone.

The pyrethroids are the basis of many insecticides. Several cyclopropane fatty acids are known.

1-Aminocyclopropane-1-carboxylic acid plays an important role in the biosynthesis of the plant hormone ethylene.
