= C4H5N =

The molecular formula C_{4}H_{5}N (molar mass: 67.09 g/mol, exact mass: 67.04220 u) may refer to:

- Allyl cyanide
- Methacrylonitrile (MeAN)
- Pyrrole
- Cyclopropyl cyanide
