= C18H18ClN =

The molecular formula C_{18}H_{18}ClN (molar mass: 283.8 g/mol) may refer to:

- McN 5707
- McN-5292
