= C3H5NS =

The molecular formula C_{3}H_{5}NS (molar mass: 87.14 g/mol, exact mass: 87.0143 u) may refer to:

- Ethyl thiocyanate
- 3-Mercaptopropionitrile
- Thiazoline
