= C16H13ClN2O =

The molecular formula C_{16}H_{13}ClN_{2}O (molar mass: 284.74 g/mol, exact mass: 284.0716 u) may refer to:

- Diazepam
- Mazindol
