= McN-5558 =

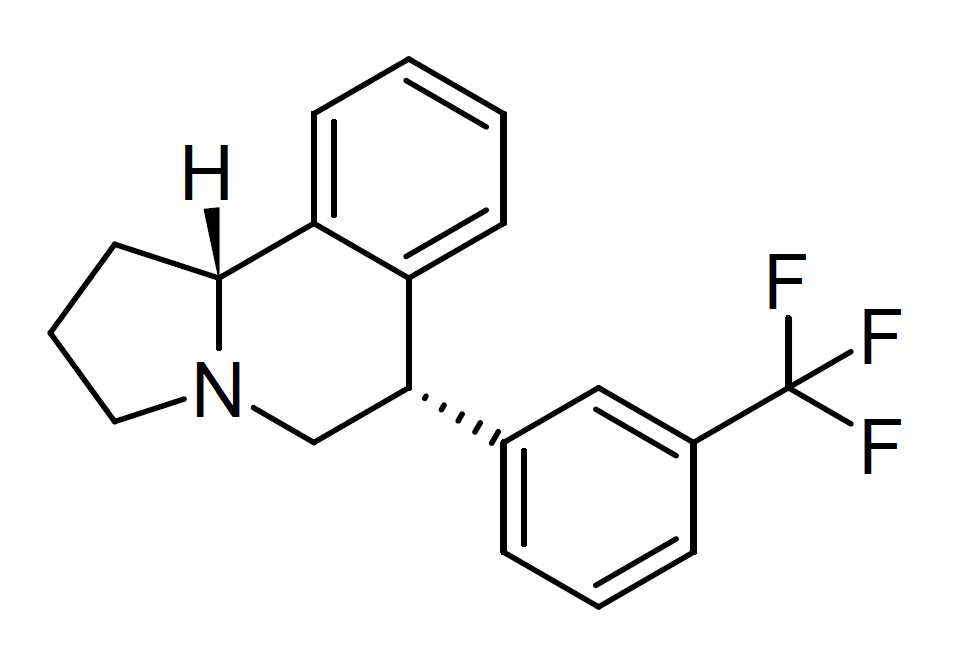

Identifiers
- IUPAC name: (6S,10bR)-6-[3-(trifluoromethyl)phenyl]-1,2,3,5,6,10b-hexahydropyrrolo[2,1-a]isoquinoline
- PubChem CID: 13646491
- ChemSpider: 23130492
- ChEMBL: ChEMBL286849

Chemical and physical data
- Formula: C_{19}H_{18}F_{3}N
- Molar mass: 317.355 g·mol^{−1}
- 3D model (JSmol): Interactive image
- SMILES: C1C[C@@H]2C3=CC=CC=C3[C@@H](CN2C1)C4=CC(=CC=C4)C(F)(F)F
- InChI: InChI=1S/C19H18F3N/c20-19(21,22)14-6-3-5-13(11-14)17-12-23-10-4-9-18(23)16-8-2-1-7-15(16)17/h1-3,5-8,11,17-18H,4,9-10,12H2/t17-,18+/m0/s1; Key:LWXKKDYZAXBAPH-ZWKOTPCHSA-N

McN-5558 is a drug which acts as a selective noradrenaline reuptake inhibitor. It was investigated for potential application as an antidepressant, but was never developed for clinical use.

== Pharmacology ==
McN-5558 is described as a serotonin–norepinephrine reuptake inhibitor (SNRI) with equilibrium constants (K_{i}s) for various neurotransmitter transporters:

| Compound 37b | norepinephrine transporter (NE) | dopamine transporter (DAT) | serotonin transporter (SERT) |
|---|---|---|---|
| racemic | 1.0 | 54.3 | 23.0 |
| (+) | 1.5 | 25.7 | 9.1 |
| (-) | 2570 | 7690 | 2920 |

These data show that virtually all of the binding affinities resides in a single enantiomer. Consequently, the compound displays a very high eudysmic ratio.

== SAR ==
In terms of the SAR, the meta-trifluorophenyl group was seen for fenfluramine, Benfluorex, and Ethyltrifluoromethylaminoindane. These are anorexigenic agents for the treatment of obesity and eating disorders.

== See also ==
- JNJ-7925476
- McN-4612
- McN-5292
- McN 5707
