= AW-15'1129 =

Adrenergic antidepressant

Clinical data
- Other names: BRN 0620708

Identifiers
- IUPAC name: 5-(4-Chlorophenyl)-2,3,5,6-tetrahydroimidazo[1,2-c]quinazoline
- CAS Number: 23597-98-0
- PubChem CID: 211824
- ChemSpider: 183656
- ChEMBL: ChEMBL1995532
- CompTox Dashboard (EPA): DTXSID00946398

Chemical and physical data
- Formula: C_{16}H_{14}ClN_{3}
- Molar mass: 283.76 g·mol^{−1}
- 3D model (JSmol): Interactive image
- SMILES: C1CN2C(NC3=CC=CC=C3C2=N1)C4=CC=C(C=C4)Cl
- InChI: InChI=1S/C16H14ClN3/c17-12-7-5-11(6-8-12)15-19-14-4-2-1-3-13(14)16-18-9-10-20(15)16/h1-8,15,19H,9-10H2; Key:HSZXGIDMRWNJCF-UHFFFAOYSA-N

AW-15'1129 is a drug with an imidazo-quinazoline based structure. The pharmacology is described as antidepressant based on strong adrenergic and anti-REM effects. It was invented by Othmar Dr Schindler of Wander AG in the 1960's. Although the drug is not known to have ever been commercialized, it is a representative example of a psychochemical based on a rational synthetic design.

In the patent the dosage of API is formulated to a strength of 4mg per tablet.

== Synthesis ==
2-aminobenzonitrile is reacted with ethylenediamine to give the cyclic aminal.

This is then refluxed with benzaldehyde in alcoholic acid to give 6-phenyl-2,3,6,7-tetrahydro-4H-pyrimido[1,2-c]quinazoline.

== See also ==
- Mazindol
- Dazadrol
- Trazium
- McN-5908
