= Mazindol =

Appetite suppressant

- Molecular structure of mazindol

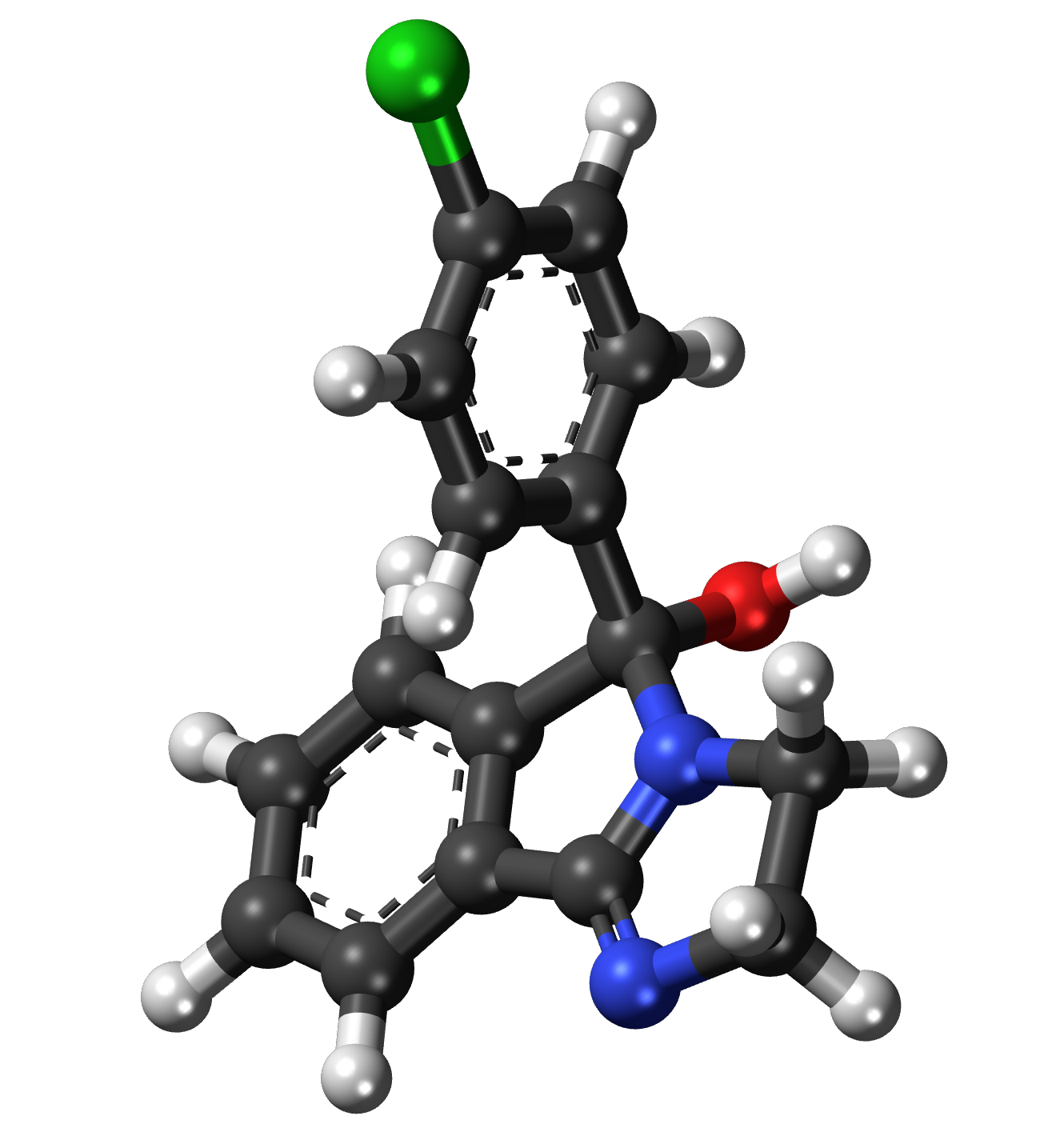
- 3D representation of a mazindol molecule

Clinical data
- Trade names: Mazanor, Sanorex
- AHFS/Drugs.com: Micromedex Detailed Consumer Information
- Routes of administration: Oral
- Drug class: Serotonin–norepinephrine–dopamine reuptake inhibitor (SNDRI); Anorectic; Wakefulness-promoting agent; Stimulant
- ATC code: A08AA05 (WHO)

Legal status
- Legal status: AU: S4 (Prescription only); BR: Class B2 (Anorectic drugs); CA: Schedule IV; DE: Anlage II (Authorized trade only, not prescriptible); US: Schedule IV

Pharmacokinetic data
- Bioavailability: 93%
- Metabolism: Hepatic
- Elimination half-life: 10–13 hours
- Excretion: Renal

Identifiers
- IUPAC name: (±)-5-(4-chlorophenyl)-3,5-dihydro-2H-imidazo[2,1-a]isoindol-5-ol
- CAS Number: 22232-71-9
- PubChem CID: 4020
- IUPHAR/BPS: 4797
- DrugBank: DB00579
- ChemSpider: 3880
- UNII: C56709M5NH
- KEGG: D00367
- ChEMBL: ChEMBL781
- CompTox Dashboard (EPA): DTXSID1023237
- ECHA InfoCard: 100.040.764

Chemical and physical data
- Formula: C_{16}H_{13}ClN_{2}O
- Molar mass: 284.74 g·mol^{−1}
- 3D model (JSmol): Interactive image
- Chirality: Racemic mixture
- SMILES: ClC1=CC=C(C2(C3=CC=CC=C3C4=NCCN42)O)C=C1
- InChI: InChI=1S/C16H13ClN2O/c17-12-7-5-11(6-8-12)16(20)14-4-2-1-3-13(14)15-18-9-10-19(15)16/h1-8,20H,9-10H2; Key:ZPXSCAKFGYXMGA-UHFFFAOYSA-N

Mazindol, sold under the brand names Mazanor and Sanorex, is an appetite suppressant which is used in the short-term treatment of obesity. It is also used off-label in the treatment of narcolepsy and cataplexy. The drug is taken orally.

Mazindol was developed by Sandoz-Wander in the 1960s. The US Food and Drug Administration approved mazindol in June 1973, but Novartis, the manufacturer, discontinued it in 1999 for reasons unrelated to its efficacy or safety.

== Medical uses ==
Mazindol is used in short-term (i.e., a few weeks) treatment of obesity, in combination with a regimen of weight reduction based on caloric restriction, exercise, and behavior modification in people with a body mass index greater than 30, or in those with a body mass index greater than 27 in the presence of risk factors such as hypertension, diabetes, or hyperlipidemia. Mazindol is not currently available as a commercially marketed and FDA-regulated prescription agent for the treatment of obesity.

Off-label use of mazindol has demonstrated efficacy in treating symptoms of narcolepsy and cataplexy. Studies beginning in the 1970s indicated that mazindol reduced sleep attacks and cataplexy with comparable efficacy to amphetamine, but with reduced cardiovascular side effects.

== Overdose ==
Symptoms of a mazindol overdose include restlessness, tremor, rapid breathing, confusion, hallucinations, panic, aggression, nausea, vomiting, diarrhea, irregular heartbeat, and seizures.

== Pharmacology ==
=== Pharmacodynamics ===
Mazindol activities
Target	Affinity (K_{i}, nM)
DAT	8.1–74 (K_{i}); 13–43 (IC_{50}) >10,000 (EC_{50})
NET	0.45–18 (K_{i}); 0.92–4.9 (IC_{50}) >10,000 (EC_{50})
SERT	39–272 (K_{i}); 54–94 (IC_{50}) >10,000 (EC_{50})
SERT_{2}	1,820 (K_{i}) (monkey)
H_{1}	600
OX_{2}	35% BI (at 10 μM); 16,000 (EC_{50}); ~25–50% (E_{max})
Notes: The smaller the value, the more avidly the drug binds to the site. All proteins are human unless otherwise specified. Refs:

Mazindol is a sympathomimetic amine, which is similar to amphetamine. It stimulates the central nervous system, which increases heart rate and blood pressure, and decreases appetite. Sympathomimetic anoretics (appetite suppressants) are used in the short-term treatment of obesity. Their appetite-reducing effect tends to decrease after a few weeks of treatment. Because of this, these medicines are useful only during the first few weeks of a weight-loss program.

Although the mechanism of action of the sympathomimetics in the treatment of obesity is not fully known, these medications have pharmacological effects similar to those of amphetamines. Like other sympathomimetic appetite suppressants, mazindol is thought to act as a reuptake inhibitor of norepinephrine, dopamine, and serotonin.

In addition to its other actions, mazindol has been found to act as a very-low-potency partial agonist of the orexin OX_{2} receptor. It showed 35% binding inhibition at the human orexin OX_{2} receptor at a concentration of 10,000 nM (a measure of binding affinity), an activational potency (EC_{50}) of 16,000 nM, and an activational efficacy (E_{max}) of approximately 25 to 50%. This action is profoundly less potent than mazindol's monoamine reuptake inhibition. Whether the orexin OX_{2} receptor partial agonism of mazindol occurs at clinically relevant concentrations or is pharmacologically significant is unclear.

== Chemistry ==
=== Tautomers ===
The hemiaminal (left) and keto (right) forms of mazindol

Mazindol exhibits pH dependent tautomerization between the keto form and the cyclic hemiaminal. Mazindol exists in the tricyclic (-ol) form in neutral media and undergoes protonation to the benzophenone tautomer in acidic media. QSAR studies have indicated that the ability of mazindol to inhibit NE and DA reuptake may be mediated by the protonated (benzophenone) tautomer.

=== Synthesis ===
The chemical synthesis of mazindol has been described.

=== Related compounds ===
Some analogues and related compounds include ciclazindol, setazindol, trazium, dazadrol, and AW-15'1129, among others.

=== QSAR ===
The pharmacophore model of mazindol proposed by Singh for the binding of mazindol at the DAT (Note: ←Page #1,012 (88th page of article) Figure 56)

From available QSAR data, the following trends are apparent:

1. Removal of the tertiary alcohol improves DAT and SERT binding without substantially reducing NET affinity. This compound has been called "mazindane".
1. Removal of the p-chlorine atom increases NET affinity and substantially reduces DAT and SERT affinity.
1. Expansion of the imidazoline ring to the corresponding six-membered homolog increases DAT affinity by ~10 fold.
1. Replacement of the phenyl moiety with a naphthyl ring system results in a ~50 fold increase in SERT affinity without significant decreases in NET or DAT affinities.
1. Halogenation of 3' and/or 4' position of the phenyl ring of mazindol results in increased potency at NET, DAT, and SERT.
1. Fluorination of the 7' position of the tricyclic phenyl ring results in a ~2 fold increase in binding affinity to DAT.

Mazindol analogs with phenyl ring substitutions (Note: ←Page #1,012 (88th page of article) Figure 57 & Page #1,013 (89th page of article) Table 51)
Compound	S. Singh's alphanumeric assignation (name)	R	R′	R′′	IC_{50} (nM) (Inhibition of [^{3}H]WIN 35428 binding)	IC_{50} (nM) (Inhibition of [^{3}H]DA uptake)	Selectivity uptake/binding
	(cocaine)				89.1 ± 8	208 ± 12	2.3
	(mazindol)	H	H	4′-Cl	8.1 ± 1.2	8.4 ± 1.3	1.0
	384a	H	H	H	66.0 ± 8.9	124 ± 37	1.9
	384b	H	H	4′-F	13.3 ± 1.8	25.4 ± 2.7	1.9
	384c	H	7-F	H	29.7 ± 7.0	78 ± 46	2.6
	384d	H	H	2′-Cl	294 ± 6	770 ± 159	2.6
	384e	H	H	3′-Cl	4.3 ± 0.4	9.2 ± 5.3	2.1
	384f	CH_{3}	H	4′-Cl	50.4 ± 5.5	106 ± 5.6	2.1
	384g	H	6-Cl	H	57.2 ± 8.3	58 ± 6.4	1.0
	384h	H	7-Cl	H	85.4 ± 14	55.17	0.6
	384i	H	7-F	4′-Cl	6.5 ± 1.2	15 ± 9	2.3
	384j	H	7-Cl	4′-F	52.8 ± 8.7	53 ± 18	1.0
	384k	H	H	2′,4′-Cl_{2}	76.5 ± 1.11	92 ± 19	1.2
	384l	H	H	3′,4′-Cl_{2}	2.5 ± 0.5	1.4 ± 1.6	0.6
	384m	H	7,8-Cl_{2}	4′-Cl	13.6 ± 1.5		
	384n	H	H	2′-Br	1340 ± 179		
	384o	H	H	4′-Br	2.6 ± 1.5	8.6 ± 3.5	3.3
	384p	H	H	4′-I	17.2 ± 0.9	14 ± 6.4	0.8

Mazindol Ring A homologues (Note: ←Page #1,012 (88th page of article) Figure 58 & Page #1,014 (90th page of article) Table 52)
Compound	S. Singh's alphanumeric assignation (name)	R	R′	IC_{50} (nM) (Inhibition of [^{3}H]WIN 35428 binding)	IC_{50} (nM) (Inhibition of [^{3}H]DA uptake)	Selectivity uptake/binding
	388a	H	H	5.8 ± 1.6	18 ± 11	3.1
	388b	H	2′-F	23.2 ± 1.7	89 ± 2.8	3.8
	388c	H	3′-F	2.0 ± 0.02	3.1 ± 1.8	1.6
	388d	H	4′-F	3.2 ± 1.7	8.5 ± 4.9	0.4
	388e	H	3′-Cl	1.0 ± 0.2	1.3 ± 0.14	1.3
	388f	H	4′-Cl	1.7 ± 0.2	1.4 ± 0.35	0.8
	388g	CH_{3}	4′-Cl	6.3 ± 4.5	1.7 ± 1.6	0.3
	389a	H		5.9 ± 0.1	11 ± 3.2	2.0
	389b	4′-Cl		1.5 ± 0.1	3.4 ± 2.3	2.3
	389c	3′,4′-Cl_{2}		1.7 ± 0.1	0.26 ± 0.16	0.2

Miscellaneous mazindol analogues
Structure	n	R	R'	R"	hSERT	hNET	hDAT	SERT/DAT Selectivity	NET/DAT Selectivity
	1	Cl	H	OH	94 ± 32	4.9 ± 0.5	43 ± 20	2.2	0.1
	1	Cl	H	H	15 ± 5	6.9 ± 1.5	6.0 ± 0.7	2.5	1.2
	1	H	H	OH	2140 ± 450	2.8 ± 0.92	730 ± 180	2.9	0.004
	1	Naphthyl		OH	1.8 ± 1.3	4.5 ± 1.5	66 ± 10	0.03	0.07
	2	Cl	H	OH	53 ± 7	4.9 ± 0.5	3.7 ± 0.4	14.3	1.3
	2	OH	H	OH	60 ± 19	1.9 ± 0.15	59.0 ± 3.6	1	0.03
	2	OMe	H	OH	94 ± 34	4.1 ± 1.4	30.4 ± 2.4	3.1	0.1
	2	-OCH2O-		OH	83 ± 29	0.62 ± 0.25	2.21 ± 0.3	37.7	0.3

== Research ==
Additional patented uses include for the treatment of schizophrenia, reducing cravings for cocaine, and for the treatment of neurobehavioral disorders.

=== Attention deficit hyperactivity disorder ===
As of 2016 mazindol was being studied in clinical trials for attention-deficit hyperactivity disorder (ADHD). There is a Swiss study investigating its efficacy in treating attention deficit hyperactivity disorder (ADHD).
