= Dazadrol =

Antidepressant

Clinical data
- Other names: Sch 12650

Identifiers
- IUPAC name: (4-chlorophenyl)-(4,5-dihydro-1H-imidazol-2-yl)-pyridin-2-ylmethanol
- CAS Number: 47029-84-5 25387-70-6
- PubChem CID: 32940
- ChemSpider: 30497
- UNII: 9U27285V5R
- ChEMBL: ChEMBL2110607
- CompTox Dashboard (EPA): DTXSID60866124
- ECHA InfoCard: 100.051.158

Chemical and physical data
- Formula: C_{15}H_{14}ClN_{3}O
- Molar mass: 287.75 g·mol^{−1}
- 3D model (JSmol): Interactive image
- SMILES: C1CN=C(N1)C(C2=CC=C(C=C2)Cl)(C3=CC=CC=N3)O
- InChI: InChI=1S/C15H14ClN3O/c16-12-6-4-11(5-7-12)15(20,14-18-9-10-19-14)13-3-1-2-8-17-13/h1-8,20H,9-10H2,(H,18,19); Key:DITYEPYMBCHKLF-UHFFFAOYSA-N

Dazadrol is a synthetic antidepressant developed by Schering Corp in the late 1960s. It acts primarily as a noradrenaline reuptake inhibitor, increasing concentrations of noradrenaline in the synaptic cleft, which is believed to underlie its antidepressant effects.

Dazadrol is classified as a pyridinemethanol derivative and has been studied for its impact on neurological function and mood. In addition to its antidepressant activity, preclinical studies in rats have shown that it inhibits both basal and induced gastric acid secretion, indicating potential gastrointestinal effects.

== See also ==
- Mazindol
- Trazium
- AW-15'1129
