= C19H21NS =

The molecular formula C_{19}H_{21}NS (molar mass: 295.44 g/mol, exact mass: 295.1395 u) may refer to:

- Dosulepin, also known as dothiepin
- McN5652
- Pizotifen, or pizotyline
