= McN 5707 =

Mcn 5707

Clinical data
- Other names: McN-5707

Identifiers
- IUPAC name: (6R,10bR)-6-(2-chlorophenyl)-1,2,3,5,6,10b-hexahydropyrrolo[2,1-a]isoquinoline
- CAS Number: 96795-88-9; hydrobromide: 109214-56-4
- PubChem CID: 126059
- ChemSpider: 112085
- ChEMBL: ChEMBL1743803
- CompTox Dashboard (EPA): DTXSID20914317

Chemical and physical data
- Formula: C_{18}H_{18}ClN
- Molar mass: 283.80 g·mol^{−1}
- 3D model (JSmol): Interactive image
- SMILES: C1C[C@@H]2C3=CC=CC=C3[C@@H](CN2C1)C4=CC=CC=C4Cl
- InChI: InChI=1S/C18H18ClN/c19-17-9-4-3-7-14(17)16-12-20-11-5-10-18(20)15-8-2-1-6-13(15)16/h1-4,6-9,16,18H,5,10-12H2/t16-,18-/m1/s1; Key:KWMNBUDYCCTHHL-SJLPKXTDSA-N

Mcn 5707 is a serotonin–norepinephrine–dopamine reuptake inhibitor (SNDRI) designated for the treatment of depression. It was developed by Bruce Maryanoff of McNeil (now Johnson & Johnson) in the 1980s.

== Binding affinities ==
Binding affinities (K_{i}) are:

Compound 24b	DA	NE	SER
racemic	35.9	1.9	8.5
(+)	17.5	1.1	5.5
(-)	775	261	537

As can be seen, most of the activity resides in a single optical antipode (or enantiomer). Hence, there is a good eudysmic ratio.

== SAR ==
For related agents, see: JNJ-7925476, McN-4612, McN-5292, McN-5558, McN5652, and McN-5908.

Other examples of drugs with ortho-chlorophenyl rings include:

1. Ketamine
2. Clofedanol
3. Clortermine
4. Tulobuterol
5. Disobutamide
6. Bidisomide
