= 1-Bromo-3-chloropropane =

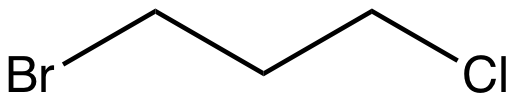

Names
- Preferred IUPAC name 1-Bromo-3-chloropropane
- Other names Trimethylene chlorobromide

Identifiers
CAS Number	109-70-6
3D model (JSmol)	Interactive image
ChEMBL	ChEMBL156560
ChemSpider	7715
ECHA InfoCard	100.003.362
EC Number	203-697-1
PubChem CID	8006
RTECS number	TX4113000
UNII	KA4WR2LS00
UN number	2688
CompTox Dashboard (EPA)	DTXSID1051565
- InChI: InChI=1S/C3H6BrCl/c4-2-1-3-5/h1-3H2 Key: MFESCIUQSIBMSM-UHFFFAOYSA-N
- SMILES: C(CCl)CBr

Properties
Chemical formula	C_{3}H_{6}BrCl
Molar mass	157.44 g·mol^{−1}
Appearance	Colorless liquid
Melting point	−58.9 °C (−74.0 °F; 214.2 K)
Boiling point	143.3 °C (289.9 °F; 416.4 K)

Hazards
- GHS labelling
Pictograms	(GHS02: Flammable) (GHS06: Toxic) (GHS07: Exclamation mark) (GHS08: Health hazard)
Signal word	Warning
Hazard statements	H226, H302, H315, H319, H331, H332, H335, H341, H412
Precautionary statements	P201, P202, P210, P233, P240, P241, P242, P243, P261, P264, P270, P271, P273, P280, P281, P301+P312, P302+P352, P303+P361+P353, P304+P312, P304+P340, P305+P351+P338, P308+P313, P311, P312, P321, P330, P332+P313, P337+P313, P362, P370+P378, P403+P233, P403+P235, P405, P501
Flash point	57 °C (135 °F; 330 K)
- Except where otherwise noted, data are given for materials in their standard state (at 25 °C [77 °F], 100 kPa). Infobox references

1-Bromo-3-chloropropane is an organohalogen compound with the formula Br(CH_{2})_{3}Cl. It is a colorless liquid, produced by free-radical addition of hydrogen bromide to allyl chloride. It is used as an alkylating agent to install the –(CH_{2})_{3}Cl and –(CH_{2})_{3}– groups. For example, it is a precursor to 4-chlorobutyronitrile.
