= Cyanoethylation =

Cyanoethylation is a process for the attachment of CH_{2}CH_{2}CN group to another organic substrate. The method is used in the synthesis of organic compounds.

Typically, cyanoethylation entails addition of protic nucleophiles to acrylonitrile, an unusually reactive Michael acceptor. Two new bonds form: C-H and C-Y (Y = carbon, nitrogen, sulfur, phosphorus, etc):
$$\mathrm{YH + H_2C{=}CH{-}CN \longrightarrow Y{-}CH_2{-}CH_2{-}CN}$$

The β-carbon atom furthest from the nitrile group is positively polarized and binds the nucleophilic center. Typical nucleophiles are derived from alcohols, thiols, and amines; and the reaction is normally catalyzed by a base.

An alternative method for cyanoethylation alkylates a substrate with 3-chloropropionitrile.

Tris(cyanoethyl)phosphine is produced by the cyanoethylation of phosphine.

Numerous commercial chemicals are prepared through the cyanethylation of amines, phosphines, and carbon nucleophiles. For example, acetone is cyanoethylated to give the keto hexanenitrile, a precursor to 2-methylpyridine.

== De-cyanoethylation ==
Cyanoethyl is a protecting group. It is removed by treatment with base:

RNuCH_{2}CH_{2}CN + OH^{−} → RNu^{−} + CH_{2}=CHCN + H_{2}O

This methodology is popular in the synthesis of oligonucleotides.
