= Cyclopropane carboxylic acid =

Identifiers
CAS Number	1759-53-1
3D model (JSmol)	Interactive image
Beilstein Reference	969839
ChEBI	CHEBI:23500
ChEMBL	ChEMBL4649900
ChemSpider	14890
ECHA InfoCard	100.015.602
EC Number	217-162-5
Gmelin Reference	2246
KEGG	C16267
PubChem CID	15655
UNII	008803351S
CompTox Dashboard (EPA)	DTXSID1040665
- InChI: InChI=1S/C4H6O2/c5-4(6)3-1-2-3/h3H,1-2H2,(H,5,6) Key: YMGUBTXCNDTFJI-UHFFFAOYSA-N
- SMILES: C1CC1C(=O)O

Properties
Chemical formula	C_{4}H_{6}O_{2}
Molar mass	86.090 g·mol^{−1}
Appearance	colorless oil
Density	1.0829 g/cm^{3}
Melting point	18.5 °C (65.3 °F; 291.6 K)
Boiling point	76 °C (169 °F; 349 K) 12 Torr

Hazards
- GHS labelling
Pictograms	(GHS05: Corrosive) (GHS07: Exclamation mark)
Signal word	Danger
Hazard statements	H302, H314
Precautionary statements	P260, P264, P264+P265, P270, P280, P301+P317, P301+P330+P331, P302+P361+P354, P304+P340, P305+P354+P338, P316, P317, P321, P330, P363, P405, P501
- Except where otherwise noted, data are given for materials in their standard state (at 25 °C [77 °F], 100 kPa). Infobox references

Cyclopropane carboxylic acid is the organic compound with the formula C_{3}H_{5}CO_{2}H. It is the carboxylic acid derivative of cyclopropane. It can be prepared by hydrolysis of cyanocyclopropane, which is obtained by base-induced cyclization of 4-chlorobutyronitrile.

== Reactions ==
Cyclopropane carboxylic acid has al pKa of 4.65, fairly typical for similar compounds. Esterification is conveniently done with Lewis acid catalysts.

The compound has been used to probe the biosynthesis of ethylene.
