= 3-Chloropropionitrile =

Names
- Preferred IUPAC name 3-Chloropropanenitrile
- Other names 1-Chloro-2-cyanoethane; β-Chloropropionitrile

Identifiers
CAS Number	542-76-7
3D model (JSmol)	Interactive image
ChemSpider	10498
ECHA InfoCard	100.008.025
PubChem CID	10963
UNII	61N7S4SZ2Q
CompTox Dashboard (EPA)	DTXSID4030336
- InChI: InChI=1S/C3H4ClN/c4-2-1-3-5/h1-2H2 Key: GNHMRTZZNHZDDM-UHFFFAOYSA-N; InChI=1/C3H4ClN/c4-2-1-3-5/h1-2H2 Key: GNHMRTZZNHZDDM-UHFFFAOYAG
- SMILES: ClCCC#N

Properties
Chemical formula	C_{3}H_{4}ClN
Molar mass	89.52 g·mol^{−1}
Appearance	colorless liquid
Density	1.1573 g/cm^{3}
Melting point	−51 °C (−60 °F; 222 K)
Boiling point	175–176 °C (347–349 °F; 448–449 K)

Hazards
- GHS labelling
Pictograms	(GHS06: Toxic) (GHS07: Exclamation mark)
Signal word	Danger
Hazard statements	H227, H300, H315, H319
Precautionary statements	P210, P264, P270, P280, P301+P310+P330, P302+P352, P305+P351+P338, P332+P313, P337+P313, P370+P378, P403+P235, P405, P501

Related compounds
Related compounds	4-Chlorobutyronitrile; Propionitrile
- Except where otherwise noted, data are given for materials in their standard state (at 25 °C [77 °F], 100 kPa). Infobox references

3-Chloropropionitrile is an organic compound with the formula ClCH_{2}CH_{2}CN. A colorless liquid, it is prepared by the reaction of hydrogen chloride with acrylonitrile. It is used commercially as a precursor to the drug famotidine.

It is an alkylating agent, as illustrated by its reaction with imidazoles to give the cyanoethylated imidazolium salts. Similarly, it alkylates thiourea, en route to 3-mercaptopropionitrile.
