= Setazindol =

Chemical compound

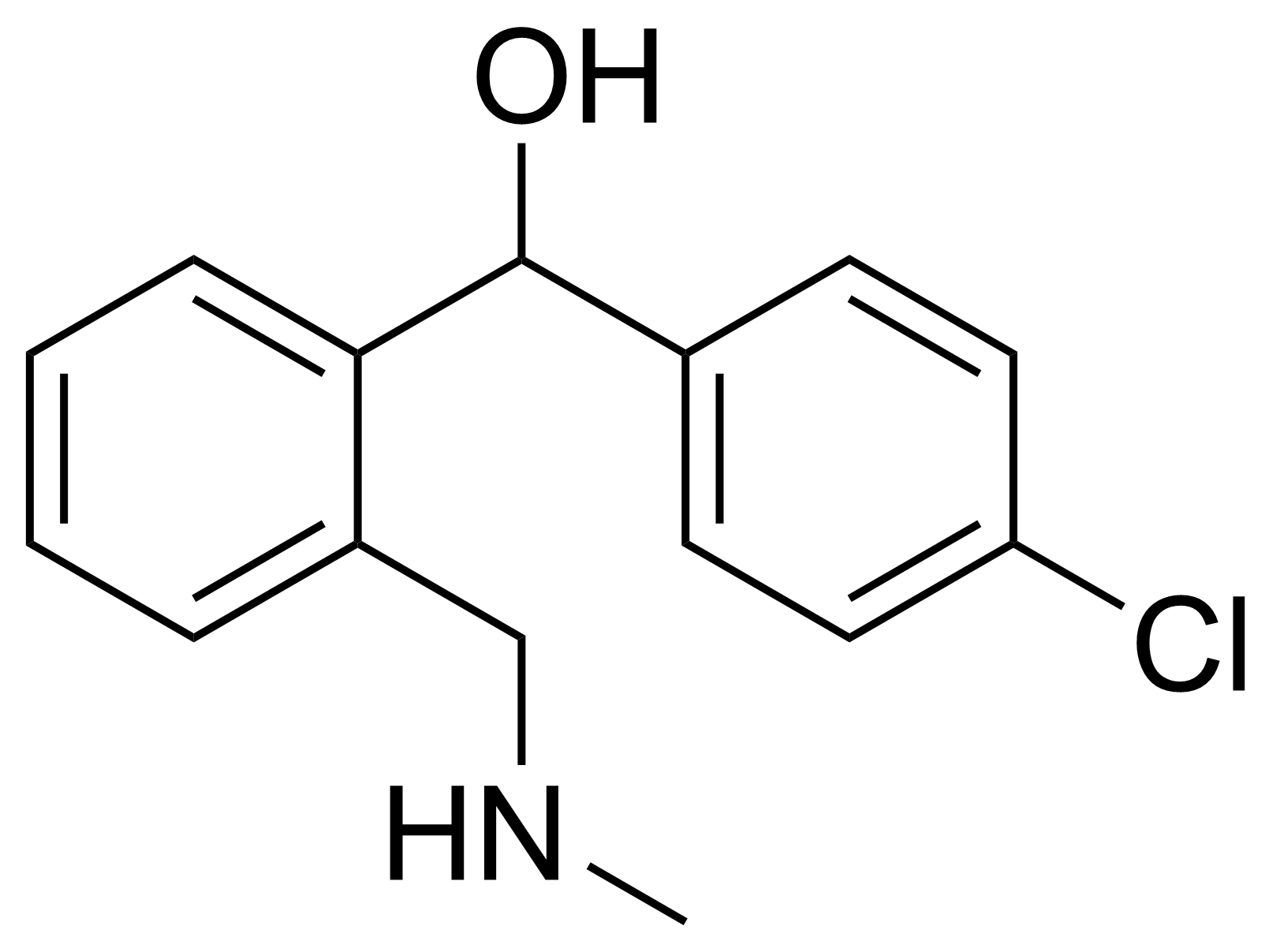

Clinical data
- ATC code: none

Identifiers
- IUPAC name: (4-Chlorophenyl)-[2-(methylaminomethyl)phenyl]methanol
- CAS Number: 56481-43-7
- PubChem CID: 193099
- ChemSpider: 167570
- UNII: 92D9H0A3WN
- CompTox Dashboard (EPA): DTXSID80866565

Chemical and physical data
- Formula: C_{15}H_{16}ClNO
- Molar mass: 261.75 g·mol^{−1}
- 3D model (JSmol): Interactive image
- SMILES: Clc1ccc(cc1)C(O)c2ccccc2CNC

Setazindol is an anorectic. It was never marketed.
