= Dibenzylaniline =

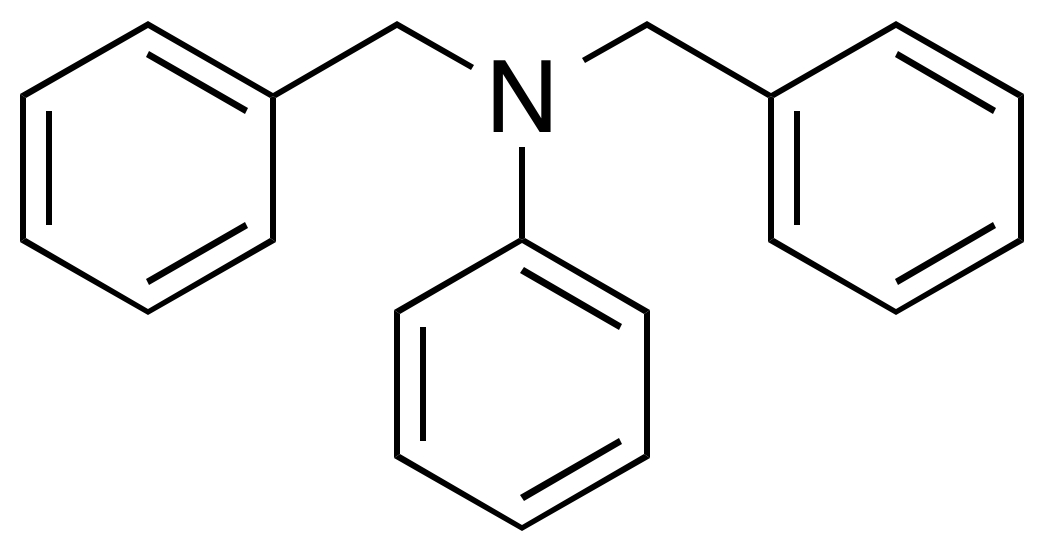

Names
- Preferred IUPAC name N,N-Dibenzylaniline

Identifiers
CAS Number	91-73-6
3D model (JSmol)	Interactive image
ChemSpider	60047
EC Number	202-093-5
PubChem CID	66681
UNII	6GF9B456WW
CompTox Dashboard (EPA)	DTXSID5059030
- InChI: InChI=1S/C20H19N/c1-4-10-18(11-5-1)16-21(20-14-8-3-9-15-20)17-19-12-6-2-7-13-19/h1-15H,16-17H2 Key: ISGXOWLMGOPVPB-UHFFFAOYSA-N
- SMILES: C1=CC=C(C=C1)CN(CC2=CC=CC=C2)C3=CC=CC=C3

Properties
Chemical formula	C_{20}H_{19}N
Molar mass	273.379 g·mol^{−1}
Appearance	yellowish white crystals
Melting point	69.0 °C (156.2 °F; 342.1 K)
Boiling point	300 °C (572 °F; 573 K) above
Solubility in water	insol
Solubility	ether, ethanol

Hazards
- GHS labelling
Pictograms	(GHS07: Exclamation mark)
Signal word	Warning
Hazard statements	H302, H312, H315, H319
Precautionary statements	P264, P270, P280, P301+P312, P302+P352, P305+P351+P338, P312, P321, P322, P330, P332+P313, P337+P313, P362, P363, P501
- Except where otherwise noted, data are given for materials in their standard state (at 25 °C [77 °F], 100 kPa). Infobox references

Dibenzylaniline or N,N-Dibenzylaniline is a chemical compound consisting of aniline with two benzyl groups as substituents on the nitrogen.

The substance crystallizes in the monoclinic crystal system. The space group is P2_{1}/n. The unit cell dimensions are a=11.751 Å b=9.060 Å c=29.522 Å, and β=94.589°. Each unit cell contains two molecules. In the solid van der Waals forces hold it together. The substance can also crystallize in alternate monoclinic form.

== Production ==
One method to produce dibenzylaniline is using a mixture of dibutyl tin dichloride and dibutyl stannane with N-benzilideneaniline along with hexamethylphosphoric triamide dissolved in tetrahydrofuran which yields a tin amide compound. This then reacts with benzyl bromide to yield dibenzylaniline.

Another method uses aniline and benzyl bromide.

== Use ==
It used to make dyes.

A nitroso derivative (made using nitrite and hydroxylamine) can be used in a colourimetric test for palladium.
