= 3-Mercaptopropionitrile =

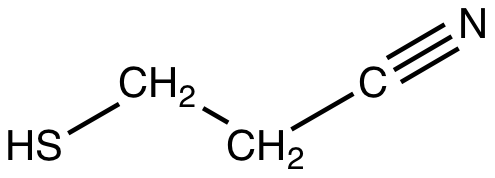

Names
- Preferred IUPAC name 3-Sulfanylpropanenitrile
- Other names β-Mercaptopropionitrile, 2-Cyanoethanethiol, 3-Mercaptopropanenitrile

Identifiers
CAS Number	1001-58-7
3D model (JSmol)	Interactive image
ChemSpider	63654
ECHA InfoCard	100.012.438
EC Number	213-682-1
PubChem CID	70477
UNII	KTV2WN28SV
CompTox Dashboard (EPA)	DTXSID4061383
- InChI: InChI=1S/C3H5NS/c4-2-1-3-5/h5H,1,3H2 Key: FCTXEFOUDMXDPD-UHFFFAOYSA-N
- SMILES: C(CS)C#N

Properties
Chemical formula	C_{3}H_{5}NS
Molar mass	87.14 g·mol^{−1}
Appearance	Colorless liquid
Density	1.0696 g/cm^{3}
Boiling point	30–32 °C (86–90 °F; 303–305 K) 0.08-0.12 mm

Hazards
- GHS labelling
Pictograms	(GHS07: Exclamation mark)
Signal word	Warning
Hazard statements	H302, H312, H315, H319, H332, H335
Precautionary statements	P261, P264, P270, P271, P280, P301+P312, P302+P352, P304+P312, P304+P340, P305+P351+P338, P312, P321, P322, P330, P332+P313, P337+P313, P362, P363, P403+P233, P405, P501
- Except where otherwise noted, data are given for materials in their standard state (at 25 °C [77 °F], 100 kPa). Infobox references

3-Mercaptopropionitrile is the organosulfur compound with the formula HSCH_{2}CH_{2}CN. Containing both thiol and nitrile functional groups, it is a bifunctional compound. A colorless liquid, the compound has found some use as a masked form of thiolate.

== Preparation and reactions ==
it is typically prepared from 3-chloropropionitrile via initial reaction with thiourea. The resulting isothiouronium salt hydrolyzes to the thiol. A variation on this preparation involves isolation of the disulfide (SCH_{2}CH_{2}CN)_{2}. Zinc reduction of this disulfide gives the thiol.

Thioethers derived from S-alkylation of 3-mercaptopropionitrile react with strong bases to give thiolate and acrylonitrile:

RSCH_{2}CH_{2}CN + KOBu-t → RSK + CH_{2}=CHCN + HOBu-t

The conversion illustrates the retro-Michael reaction. The thiolate is then hydrolyzed

RSK + H^{+} → RSH + K^{+}
