= McN-5908 =

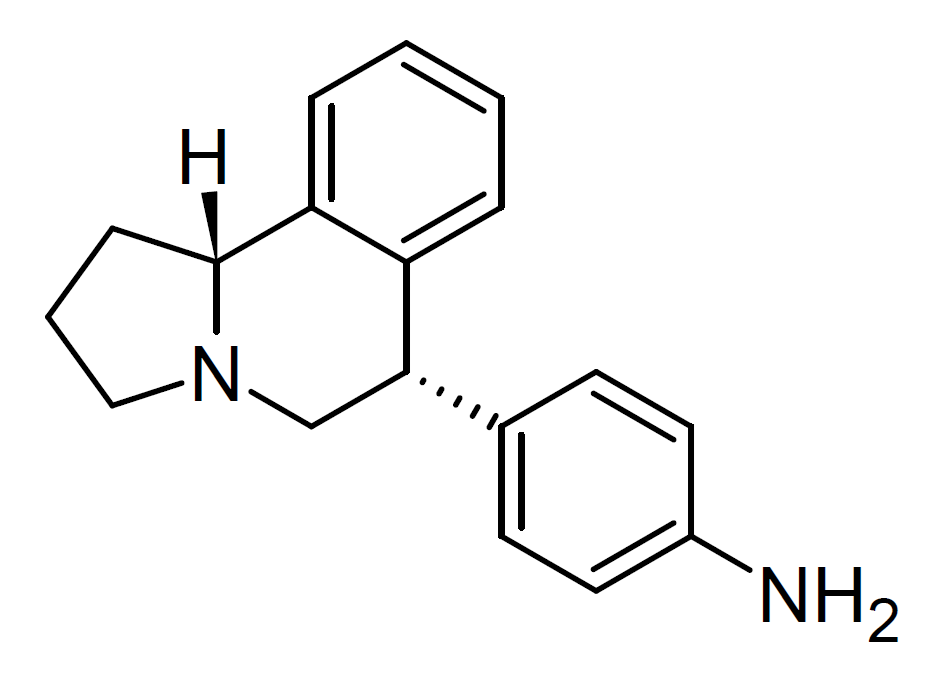

Identifiers
- IUPAC name: 4-[(6S,10bR)-1,2,3,5,6,10b-Hexahydropyrrolo[2,1-a]isoquinolin-6-yl]aniline
- CAS Number: 105234-91-1
- PubChem CID: 147075
- ChemSpider: 129699
- CompTox Dashboard (EPA): DTXSID20909389

Chemical and physical data
- Formula: C_{18}H_{20}N_{2}
- Molar mass: 264.372 g·mol^{−1}
- 3D model (JSmol): Interactive image
- SMILES: C1C[C@@H]2C3=CC=CC=C3[C@@H](CN2C1)C4=CC=C(C=C4)N
- InChI: InChI=1S/C18H20N2/c19-14-9-7-13(8-10-14)17-12-20-11-3-6-18(20)16-5-2-1-4-15(16)17/h1-2,4-5,7-10,17-18H,3,6,11-12,19H2/t17-,18+/m0/s1; Key:YFRXDBYFLJJYEW-ZWKOTPCHSA-N

McN-5908 is a stimulant drug which acts as a dopamine reuptake inhibitor, with similar inhibition of noradrenaline reuptake but much weaker activity at serotonin reuptake.

In the SAR citation, compound 52 has the following K_{i} values (nM): DA = 0.86, NE = 0.20, SER = 44. McN-5908 is one of the most powerful psychostimulants ever discovered and the most potent in this series of agents. However it does have some toxicity to be contended with.

In terms of the SAR, McN-5908 can probably be best compared to a Hoechst agent appearing in the chemical literature SAR analogy between this agent and nomifensine (Alival) was also performed. In terms of the SAR, it is noteworthy to mention that the para-amino analog of venlafaxine was also known to have been invented. Finally, Louis Lafon invented some clenbuterol alpha-methyl cathinone analogs with some of the compounds lacking the chlorine halogen atoms. These compounds were all explored in the context of their antidepressant activity. Louis Lafron is the same chemist who invented modafinil and flerobuterol.

== See also ==
- Diclofensine
- Dimethocaine
- JNJ-7925476
- McN-4612
- McN-5292
- McN 5707
