= McN-5292 =

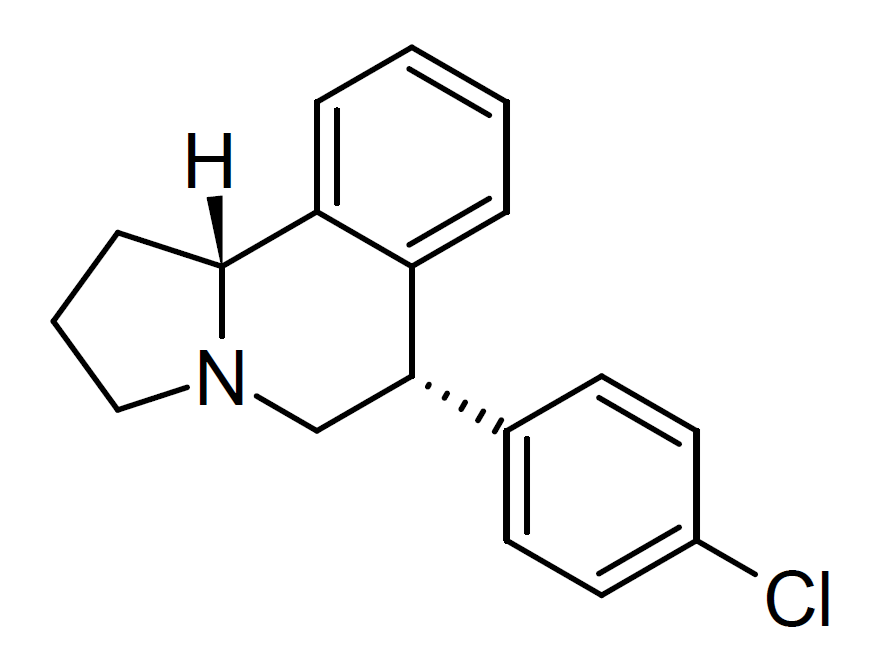

Identifiers
- IUPAC name: (6S,10bR)-6-(4-chlorophenyl)-1,2,3,5,6,10b-hexahydropyrrolo[2,1-a]isoquinoline
- CAS Number: 105234-89-7
- PubChem CID: 128348
- ChemSpider: 23130219

Chemical and physical data
- Formula: C_{18}H_{18}ClN
- Molar mass: 283.80 g·mol^{−1}
- 3D model (JSmol): Interactive image
- SMILES: C1C[C@@H]2C3=CC=CC=C3[C@@H](CN2C1)C4=CC=C(C=C4)Cl
- InChI: InChI=1S/C18H18ClN/c19-14-9-7-13(8-10-14)17-12-20-11-3-6-18(20)16-5-2-1-4-15(16)17/h1-2,4-5,7-10,17-18H,3,6,11-12H2/t17-,18+/m0/s1; Key:NYIDPSGGLMYASF-ZWKOTPCHSA-N

McN-5292 is a stimulant drug which acts as a triple reuptake inhibitor, producing potent inhibition of the reuptake of all three monoamines, but around 10x selectivity for noradrenaline reuptake compared to dopamine and serotonin.

Compound 22b in the table had Ki(nM): DA=1.7, NE=0.16, SER=1.5.

In terms of the SAR, it would be useful to compare for RTI-31 or RTI-113 for example.

== See also ==
- AW-15'1129
- Diclofensine
- JNJ-7925476
- McN-4612
- McN 5707
- McN-5908
- RTI-31
