= Ethyl thiocyanate =

Chemical compound

Names
- Preferred IUPAC name Ethyl thiocyanate
- Other names Ethyl rhodanate; Ethyl sulfocyanate; Aethylrhodanid

Identifiers
CAS Number	542-90-5
3D model (JSmol)	Interactive image
ChemSpider	10503
ECHA InfoCard	100.008.031
PubChem CID	10968
UNII	PF9AD5G86Z
CompTox Dashboard (EPA)	DTXSID7060259
- InChI: InChI=1S/C3H5NS/c1-2-5-3-4/h2H2,1H3 Key: WFCLYEAZTHWNEH-UHFFFAOYSA-N; InChI=1/C3H5NS/c1-2-5-3-4/h2H2,1H3 Key: WFCLYEAZTHWNEH-UHFFFAOYAE
- SMILES: CCSC#N

Properties
Chemical formula	C_{3}H_{5}NS
Molar mass	87.14 g/mol
Magnetic susceptibility (χ)	−55.7·10^{−6} cm^{3}/mol
- Except where otherwise noted, data are given for materials in their standard state (at 25 °C [77 °F], 100 kPa). Infobox references

Ethyl thiocyanate is a chemical compound used as an agricultural insecticide. It is also present as a volatile organic compound (VOC) in agricultural fungicides. It is a cyanide compound.
