= Cyclopropyl cyanide =

Names
- Preferred IUPAC name Cyclopropanecarbonitrile
- Other names Cyanocyclopropane

Identifiers
CAS Number	5500-21-0
3D model (JSmol)	Interactive image
ChemSpider	71940
ECHA InfoCard	100.024.397
EC Number	226-836-8
PubChem CID	79637
UNII	AFU99GZS5D
CompTox Dashboard (EPA)	DTXSID1063936
- InChI: InChI=1S/C4H5N/c5-3-4-1-2-4/h4H,1-2H2 Key: AUQDITHEDVOTCU-UHFFFAOYSA-N
- SMILES: N#CC1CC1

Properties
Chemical formula	C_{4}H_{5}N
Molar mass	67.0892g/mol
Appearance	clear to light yellow liquid
Density	0.911g/mL
Melting point	−25 °C (−13 °F; 248 K)
Boiling point	135 °C (275 °F; 408 K)
Solubility in water	soluble in water
log P	1.196

Hazards
- Occupational safety and health (OHS/OSH)
Main hazards	Toxic, hazardous if inhaled, contacted with skin, or swallowed
- GHS labelling
Pictograms	(GHS02: Flammable) (GHS06: Toxic) (GHS07: Exclamation mark)
Signal word	Danger
Hazard statements	H226, H301, H311, H315, H319, H330, H331, H335
Precautionary statements	P210, P233, P240, P241, P242, P243, P260, P264, P270, P271, P280, P284, P301+P310, P302+P352, P303+P361+P353, P304+P340, P305+P351+P338, P310, P311, P312, P320, P321, P330, P332+P313, P337+P313, P361, P362, P363, P370+P378, P403+P233, P403+P235, P405, P501
Flash point	40 °C (104 °F; 313 K)

Thermochemistry
Std enthalpy of combustion (Δ_{c}H^{⦵}_{298})	182.7
- Except where otherwise noted, data are given for materials in their standard state (at 25 °C [77 °F], 100 kPa). Infobox references

Cyclopropyl cyanide is an organic compound consisting of a nitrile group as a substituent on a cyclopropane ring. It is the smallest cyclic compound containing a nitrile.

== Structure ==
The structure of cyclopropyl cyanide has been determined by a variety of experiments, including microwave spectroscopy, rotational spectroscopy and photodissociation. In 1958, cyclopropyl cyanide was first studied for its rotational spectra, by Friend and Dailey. An additional experiment involving cyclopropyl cyanide was the determination of the molecular dipole moment through spectroscopy experiments, by Carvalho in 1967.

== Production ==
Cyclopropyl cyanide is prepared by the reaction of 4-chlorobutyronitrile with a strong base, such as sodium amide in liquid ammonia.

== Reactions ==
Hydrolysis gives cyclopropane carboxylic acid. Cyclopropyl cyanide, when heated to 660-760K and under pressure of 2-89torr, becomes cis and trans crotonitrile and allyl cyanide molecules, with some presence of methacrylonitrile. This is an isomerization reaction that is homogeneous with rate of first order. The reaction result is due to the biradical mechanism, which involves the formation of carbon radicals as the three carbon ring opens up. The radicals then react to yield carbon=carbon double bonds.
