= Methacrylonitrile =

Names
- Preferred IUPAC name 2-Methylprop-2-enenitrile
- Other names Methylacrylonitrile; 2-Cyanopropene; 2-Cyano-1-propene; Isopropenecyanide; Isopropenylcyanid; Isopropene cyanide

Identifiers
CAS Number	126-98-7
3D model (JSmol)	Interactive image
Abbreviations	MeAN
ChEMBL	ChEMBL1529759
ChemSpider	29101
ECHA InfoCard	100.004.380
EC Number	204-817-5
PubChem CID	31368
RTECS number	UD1400000
UNII	04S4K38612
UN number	3079
CompTox Dashboard (EPA)	DTXSID1024176
- InChI: InChI=1S/C4H5N/c1-4(2)3-5/h1H2,2H3 Key: GYCMBHHDWRMZGG-UHFFFAOYSA-N
- SMILES: C=C(C)C#N

Properties
Chemical formula	C_{4}H_{5}N
Molar mass	67.091 g·mol^{−1}
Appearance	Clear colorless to very slightly yellow liquid
Odor	Bitter almonds
Density	0.8 g/mL
Melting point	−35.8 °C (−32.4 °F; 237.3 K)
Boiling point	90 to 92 °C (194 to 198 °F; 363 to 365 K)
Solubility in water	2.57 g/100 mL (20 °C)
Vapor pressure	71 mmHg (25 °C)

Hazards
- GHS labelling
Pictograms	(GHS02: Flammable) (GHS06: Toxic) (GHS07: Exclamation mark)
Signal word	Danger
Hazard statements	H225, H301, H311, H317, H331
Precautionary statements	P210, P233, P240, P241, P242, P243, P261, P264, P270, P271, P272, P280, P301+P310, P302+P352, P303+P361+P353, P304+P340, P311, P312, P321, P322, P330, P333+P313, P361, P363, P370+P378, P403+P233, P403+P235, P405, P501
Flash point	13 °C (55 °F; 286 K)
Explosive limits	2%-6.8%
- NIOSH (US health exposure limits)
PEL (Permissible)	none
REL (Recommended)	TWA 1 ppm (3 mg/m^{3}) [skin]
IDLH (Immediate danger)	N.D.
- Except where otherwise noted, data are given for materials in their standard state (at 25 °C [77 °F], 100 kPa). Infobox references

Methacrylonitrile (or 2-Methylprop-2-enenitrile), MeAN in short, is a chemical compound that is an unsaturated aliphatic nitrile, widely used in the preparation of homopolymers, copolymers, elastomers, and plastics and as a chemical intermediate in the preparation of acids, amides, amines, esters, and other nitriles. MeAN is also used as a replacement for acrylonitrile in the manufacture of an acrylonitrile/butadiene/styrene-like polymer. It is a clear and colorless (to slightly yellow) liquid, that has a bitter almond smell.

It is toxic by ingestion, inhalation, and skin absorption.

== Exposure and regulation ==
Since MeAN is present in polymeric coating materials as found in many everyday use items, humans are exposed to it by skin absorption. Aside from this there is an occupational exposure, and low levels of MeAN are also present in the smoke of unfiltered cigarettes made from air-cured or flue-cured tobaccos.

Due to the toxicity of MeAN, the U.S. Department of Health & Human Services has limited the concentration of methacrylonitrile-derived polymer in resinous and polymeric coating materials to 41%. Its use in food packaging is further limited to 0.5 mg per square inch of food-contact surface, and only 50 ppm, or 0.005% MeAN is permitted in chloroform-soluble coating components in water containers (21 CFR, § 175.300). A time-weighted average (TWA) threshold limit value of 1 ppm (3 mg/m3) for MeAN exposure was adopted by the American Conference of Governmental Industrial Hygienists.

The National Cancer Institute (USA) nominated MeAN for research because of its potential for human exposure, the common features shared with the known carcinogen acrylonitrile and the shortcoming of knowledge in toxicity and carcinogenicity of MeAN.

== Structure and reactivity ==
Methacrylonitrile is an acrylonitrile (AN) with an additional CH_{3} group on the second carbon. Polymerization does not require a catalyst and happens rapidly in the absence of a stabilizer.

Because of its double bond, additional reactions are possible with biological molecules. The extra methyl group of MeAN lessens the electron-withdrawing effect caused by the nitrile so that reactions that form negative charge on the alpha carbon are faster with AN as the reactant. Inversely, reactions that form a positive charge on said carbon (i.g. Cytochrome-P450 oxidation of the double bond), are faster with MeAN as the reactant. As a result, in metabolism, MeAN conjugates less with glutathione (GSH) than AN, and is activated more easily.

== Synthesis ==
Poly(acrylonitrile) is generally made via emulsion or solution polymerization. The commercial product can be stabilized by the addition of 50 ppm hydroquinone monoethyl ether. The polymerization of MeAN is carried out in tetrahydrofuran (THF) with the disodium salt of polyethylene oxide (PEO). MeAN is also commercially produced by the vapor-phase reaction of isobutylene with ammonia and oxygen in the presence of a catalyst. Acetonitrile, hydrogen cyanide and acrolein are known by-products. It is used in the preparation of homo- and copolymers, elastomers, coatings and plastics. It can be used as a replacement for acrylonitrile in similar reactions. MeAN can also be synthesized by dehydration of methacrylamide or from isopropylene oxide and ammonia.

== Reactions ==
MeAN can undergo electropolymerization, if it is submitted to electroreduction at metallic cathodes in an organic anhydrous medium, for example; acetonitrile. There are two types of polymers that can be obtained at the end of the synthesis; a physisorbed polymer and a grafted polymer. The mechanism accounting for the non-grafted polymer is pretty well understood: it proceeds via the formation of a radical anion (the product of reduction of the vinylic monomer), which dimerizes in solution because of a radical–radical coupling mechanism (RRC) to deliver a di-anion acting as the initiator of a polymerization reaction in solution.

== Metabolism ==
There are different metabolizing pathways for methacrylonitrile, that are elaborated here:

First of all, methacrylonitrile can be directly conjugated with GSH, which leads to the formation of S-(2-cyanopropyl) GSH, which can be metabolized to N-acetyl-S- (2-cyanopropyl) cysteine (NACPC), which can be excreted in the urine.

Due to this, glutathione is depleted to certain degrees after MeAN exposure. After oral exposure to 100 mg/kg MeAN in rats, the maximum depletion was noticed in the liver at 39% of control. This depletion, however, is less than found after AN administration. This is likely because MeAN exists in part bound to red blood cells, and is therefore unavailable for GSH conjugation. Studies using radiolabeled carbon point out that the primary route by which methacrylonitrile left the body is the urine, at 43% of the dose. An additional 18% is excreted in faeces (15%) and exhaled air (2.5%). This means that about 40% of MeAN does not leave the body immediately and is either bound to macromolecules or forms unexcretable conjugates. The red blood cells retained significant amounts of radioactivity: more than 50% of the radioactivity in erythrocytes was detected as covalently bound to hemoglobin and membrane proteins.

Secondly, methacrylonitrile can be metabolised in the liver by CYP2E1 (a Cytochrome-P450 enzyme). This is the most important enzyme for the oxidative metabolism, but also other cytochrome P-450 enzymes may be involved. The oxidative reaction by Cytochrome-P450 enzymes will lead to the formation of an epoxide intermediate, which shows reactivity. This epoxide intermediate is highly unstable and could lead to the formation of cyanide via different transformations. For example, via epoxide hydratase (EH) or via interactions with a sulfhydryl compound, which leads to the formation of a cyanohydrin that could rearrange to an aldehyde and thereby can possibly result in cyanide release. The epoxide can also be conjugated with GSH.

It has been shown that treatment of mice with carbon tetrachloride, which acts on the mixed function oxygenase system, results in much lower cyanide concentrations than controls and greatly reduced toxicity of MeAN, indicating that cyanide production is indeed the main pathway of toxicity, unlike AN, which is more carcinogenic. More information about toxicity of cyanide see: cyanide poisoning.

== Toxicity in humans ==
Human toxicity has not been well analyzed. Minimum threshold values for odor detections are reported to be at 7 ppm, with the majority of subjects detecting it at higher concentrations of 14 or 24 ppm. At concentrations of 24 ppm incidence of throat, eye and nose irritation occur. No deaths caused by methacrylonitrile poisoning have been reported.

== Effects on animals ==
Inhalation, and oral and dermal administration, of methacrylonitrile can cause acute deaths in animals, often preceded by convulsions and loss of consciousness. Signs of the toxic effects of methacrylonitrile in rats after oral absorption are ataxia, trembling, convulsions, mild diarrhea and irregular breathing. The main cause of toxic effects at lethal (and threshold) levels of MeAN is damage to the central nervous system. This, along with the signs of toxic effects displayed by all tested animals, is consistent with cyanide poisoning. Methacrylonitrile differs herein from acrylonitrile, which does not show cyanide related signs of toxicity.

Cyanide production after exposure to MeAN has been tested, and intravenous injection of MeAN in rabbits results in production of significant levels of cyanide in the blood. In Wistar rats too, toxicity is related to the in vivo liberation of cyanide after exposure to MeAN. The acute toxicity of MeAN can also be antagonized with cyanide antidotes.

A difference in resistance to the lethal effects of MeAN can be noted between species. For inhalation, a 4-hour exposure period gives a LC_{50} of 328-700 ppm for rats, 88 ppm for guinea pigs, 37 ppm for rabbits and 36 ppm for mice. In dogs acute lethality by inhalation is also noted, although no LC_{50} has been determined. Oral administration of MeAN has been tested on rats, mice and gerbils, showing a LD_{50} of 200 mg/kg for rats, 17 mg/kg for mice and 4 mg/kg for gerbils. Skin administration on rabbits causes death at a LC_{50} of 268 mg/kg. The NOAEL and LOAEL values for rats are determined at 50 mg/kg for NOAEL and 100 mg/kg for LOAEL. This is based on another sign of methacrylonitrile poisoning; urine retention, with 58% of rats showing bladder distention at an administered dose of 100 mg/kg.

Reproductive toxicity was tested in rats, but different outcomes have been reported. Willhite et al. suggest a LOAEL for reproductive effects of 50 mg/kg, while a report by the National Research Council claims no significant reproductive effects have been found.

Lastly, carcinogenic, mutagenic and genotoxic effects have been tested but unlike acrylonitrile, methacrylonitrile does not show signs of any such effects.
