= McN5652 =

Names
- IUPAC name rel-(6R,10bS)-6-[4-(Methylsulfanyl)phenyl]-1,2,3,5,6,10b-hexahydropyrrolo[2,1-a]isoquinoline
- Other names trans-McN-5652

Identifiers
CAS Number	96795-89-0 (±)-trans
3D model (JSmol)	Interactive image
ChEMBL	ChEMBL361259
ChemSpider	4891622
PubChem CID	6336338
UNII	21MT8QF2LI
CompTox Dashboard (EPA)	DTXSID001128845
- InChI: InChI=1S/C19H21NS/c1-21-15-10-8-14(9-11-15)18-13-20-12-4-7-19(20)17-6-3-2-5-16(17)18/h2-3,5-6,8-11,18-19H,4,7,12-13H2,1H3/t18-,19+/m1/s1 Key: YVKDUIAAPBKHMJ-MOPGFXCFSA-N; InChI=1/C19H21NS/c1-21-15-10-8-14(9-11-15)18-13-20-12-4-7-19(20)17-6-3-2-5-16(17)18/h2-3,5-6,8-11,18-19H,4,7,12-13H2,1H3/t18-,19+/m1/s1 Key: YVKDUIAAPBKHMJ-MOPGFXCFBW
- SMILES: CSC1=CC=C([C@H]2CN3[C@](CCC3)([H])C4=C2C=CC=C4)C=C1

Properties
Chemical formula	C_{19}H_{21}NS
Molar mass	295.44 g·mol^{−1}
- Except where otherwise noted, data are given for materials in their standard state (at 25 °C [77 °F], 100 kPa). verify (what is ?) Infobox references

McN5652 is a molecule that can be radiolabeled and then used as a radioligand in positron emission tomography (PET) studies. The [^{11}C]-(+)-McN5652 enantiomer binds to the serotonin transporter. The radioligand is used for molecular neuroimaging and for imaging of the lungs.

It was developed by Johnson & Johnson's McNeil Laboratories. According to McNeil, McN5652 was among the strongest SRI ever reported at the time of its discovery (sub nM Ki). However, it is not completely 5-HT selective: the racemate has 5-HT=0.68, NA=2.9, and D=36.8nM, whereas (+)-enantiomer has 5-HT=0.39, NA=1.8, and D=23.5 nM. Paroxetine was listed as 5-HT=0.44 nM, NA=20, and DA=460nM in the same paper by the same authors.

== Derivatives ==
McN5652 and related structures have been analyzed for QSAR in terms of binding to the MAT receptor binding site.

== See also ==
- DASB
- JNJ-7925476 (p-ethynyl)
