= Trazium =

Chemical compound

Trazium INN: Trazium esilate
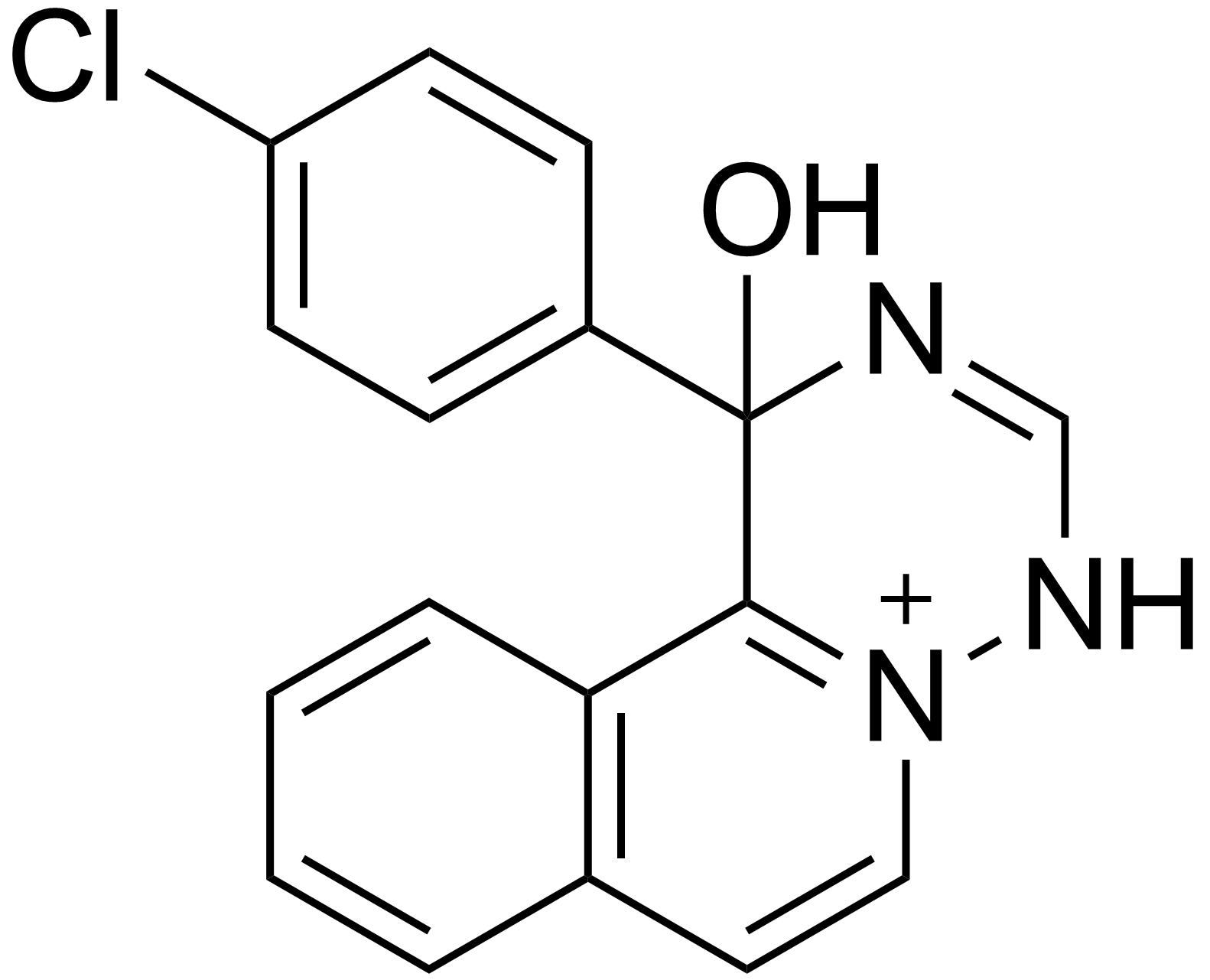

Clinical data
- Routes of administration: Oral
- ATC code: none

Legal status
- Legal status: In general: uncontrolled

Identifiers
- IUPAC name: 1-(4-Chlorophenyl)-1-hydroxy-1,4-dihydro[1,2,4]triazino[6,1-a]isoquinolin-5-ium
- CAS Number: 97110-59-3
- PubChem CID: 72166
- ChemSpider: 65139
- UNII: 1PO9LWW5IN
- CompTox Dashboard (EPA): DTXSID70910384

Chemical and physical data
- Formula: C_{17}H_{13}ClN_{3}O
- Molar mass: 310.76 g·mol^{−1}

Trazium (EGYT-3,615) is an antidepressant drug which was never marketed. It has psychostimulant-like effects and its actions appear to be mediated by the dopaminergic and adrenergic systems. It was formulated as a salt with ethanesulfonic acid and given the generic name trazium esilate (INN).

== Synthesis ==
Precursors: Background literature:

Ex 5: The Grignard reaction between para-chlorophenylmagnesium bromide and 1-cyanoisoquinoline [1198-30-7] (1) gave 1-(4-chlorobenzoyl)isoquinoline, PC12243105 (2). The reaction of this with O-tosylhydroxylamine [52913-14-1] gives (2-aminoisoquinolin-2-ium-1-yl)-(4-chlorophenyl)methanone;4-methylbenzenesulfonate, PC23311140 (3). The reaction of this a mixture of formamide and phosphoryl chloride gave the ring. The addition of perchloric acid led to 1-(4-Chlorophenyl)[1,2,4]triazino[6,1-a]isoquinolin-5-ium perchlorate [82319-70-8] (4). The reaction of this with triethylammonium bromide is said to give (4).

Patent:

Ex 1: 1-(4-chlorophenyl)-as-triazino[6,1-a]isoquinolinium-bromide [82319-85-5] (1) is reacted with an aqueous solution of acetonitrile to give the title compound. Ex 2: Treatment with ethanesulfonic acid in acetonitrile then prepares the esilate salt.
