= JNJ-7925476 =

Chemical compound

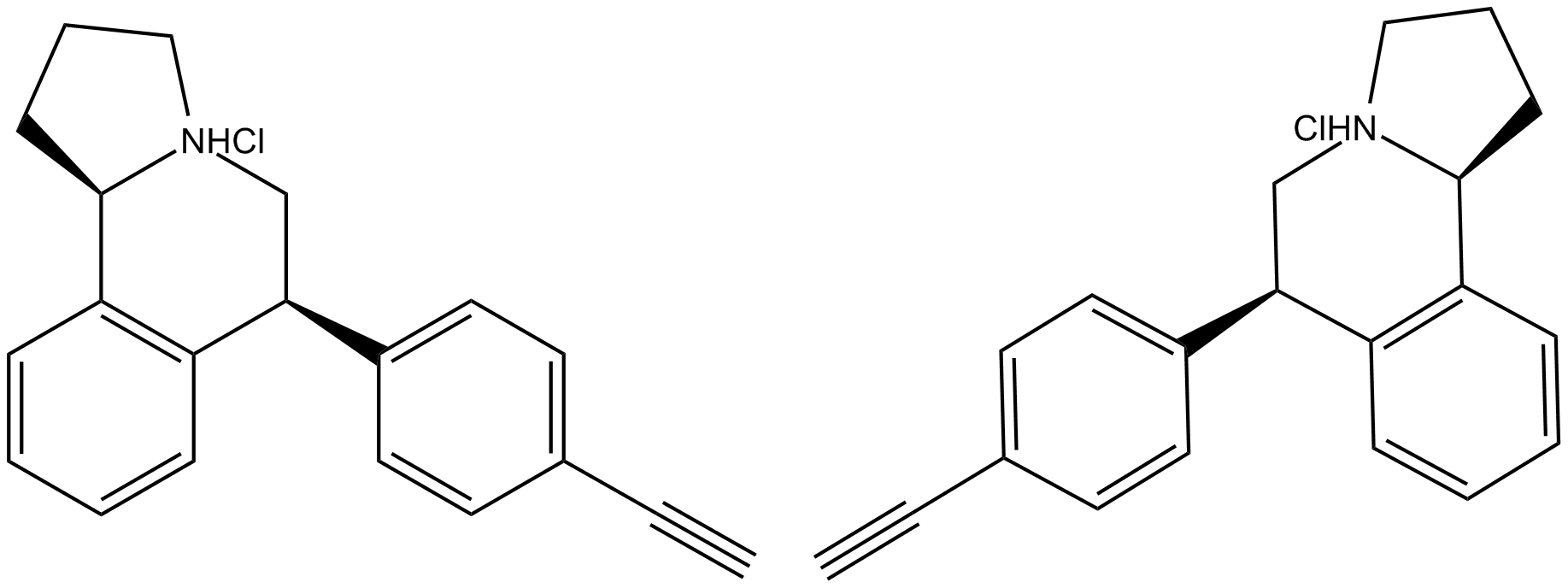

Identifiers
- IUPAC name: (6S,10bR)-6-(4-Ethynylphenyl)-1H,2H,3H,5H,6H,10bH-pyrrolo[2,1-a]isoquinoline
- CAS Number: 129540-12-1; HCl: 109085-56-5
- PubChem CID: 13903191
- ChemSpider: 23130640
- UNII: VSM44B5G3G; HCl: IQ02SF57WP
- ChEMBL: ChEMBL286312
- CompTox Dashboard (EPA): DTXSID001134549

Chemical and physical data
- Formula: C_{20}H_{19}N
- Molar mass: 273.379 g·mol^{−1}
- 3D model (JSmol): Interactive image
- SMILES: C#CC1=CC=C(C=C1)[C@@H]2CN3CCC[C@@H]3C4=CC=CC=C24
- InChI: InChI=1S/C20H19N/c1-2-15-9-11-16(12-10-15)19-14-21-13-5-8-20(21)18-7-4-3-6-17(18)19/h1,3-4,6-7,9-12,19-20H,5,8,13-14H2/t19-,20+/m0/s1; Key:YPFCCQUUZJDQAM-VQTJNVASSA-N

JNJ-7925476 is a triple reuptake inhibitor antidepressant discovered by Johnson & Johnson, but never marketed.

These molecules were first prepared by Bruce E. Maryanoff and coworkers during the late 1970s–1980s. The structure is a pyrroloisoquinoline core, with an overlaid benzhydryl motif.

Incorporating the pyrrolidino ring onto the tetrahydroisoquinoline scaffolding markedly improves potency, although this only works for one of the available stereoisomers. JNJ-7925476 is a racemic preparation of the more potent diastereomer. Of these enantiomers, the eutomer is the (6R,10bS) stereoisomer, known as JNJ-39836966, and the distomer, (6S,10bR), is JNJ-39836732

There is some confusion over the nomenclature and cis/trans isomeric relationship at the piperidine ring. The compounds as depicted have the carbon of the pyrrolidine carbon and the phenyl cis, but Maryanoff and coworkers are of the opinion that the compound is trans. (see abstract)

The reason for this is not known because it was referred to as "cis" in earlier reports, and then later reassigned.

== In-vitro characterization ==
Ki values (nM) for JNJ-7925476 and its constituent enantiomers (JNJ-39836966 and JNJ-39836732)

JNJ	rSERT	hSERT	hDAT	hNET
7925476	0.4	0.9	5.2	16.6
39836966	0.33	0.27	1.6	15.8
39836732	17.0	4.1	74.3	227

In vitro, JNJ-7925476 is ~18-fold selective for the hSERT (0.9 nM) over the hNET (16.6 nM).

Ex vivo transporter occupancy of JNJ-7925476 (in rat brain) followed the ordering priority: NET > SERT > DAT.

This is consistent with the results cited earlier for rat brains (see SAR table dated 1987).

However, there is relatively poor correlation between the in vitro data presented for rats brains vs what was reported at the human transporters.

== μ-Dialysis ==
Elevations in extracellular DA in vivo was higher than expected on the basis of the in vitro transporter affinities.

The authors speculate that this could be because in the PFC where DATs are low in number, DA is predominantly transported via the NET.

- ~ 1 mg/kg of JNJ-7925476 caused concentrations of NE, 5-HT and DA to all be elevated by just under 500%, respectively.

Ex vivo occupancy of the DAT was much lower (<50%) at this dose though, whereas the NET and SERT were similar (~90%).

It took a much higher dose (cf. 10 mg/kg) for the DAT occupancy to approach the same as the NET and SERT (i.e. saturation).

At saturation, the elevation in synaptic DA was extremely prolific (15 × baseline), whereas SER and NE was ≈ ½ this amount (i.e. 750%).

== Pyrroloisoquinolines structure activity relationships ==
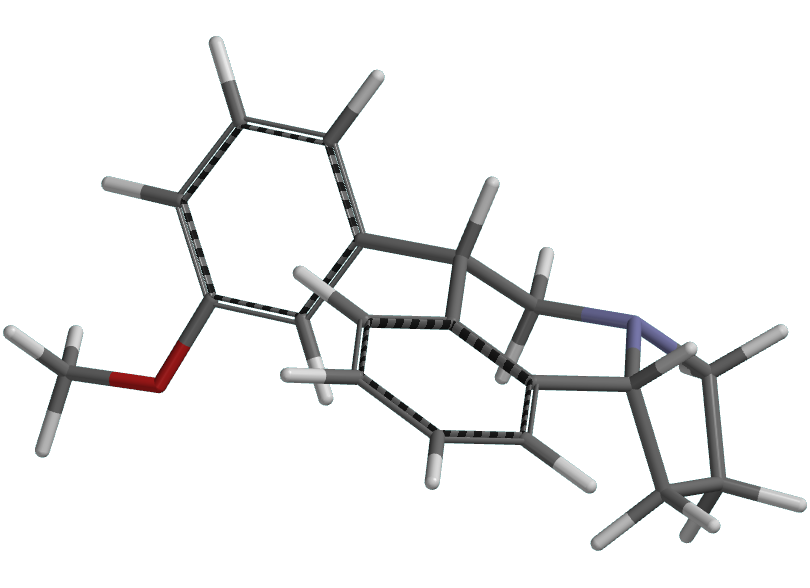
3d structure, Y = OMe

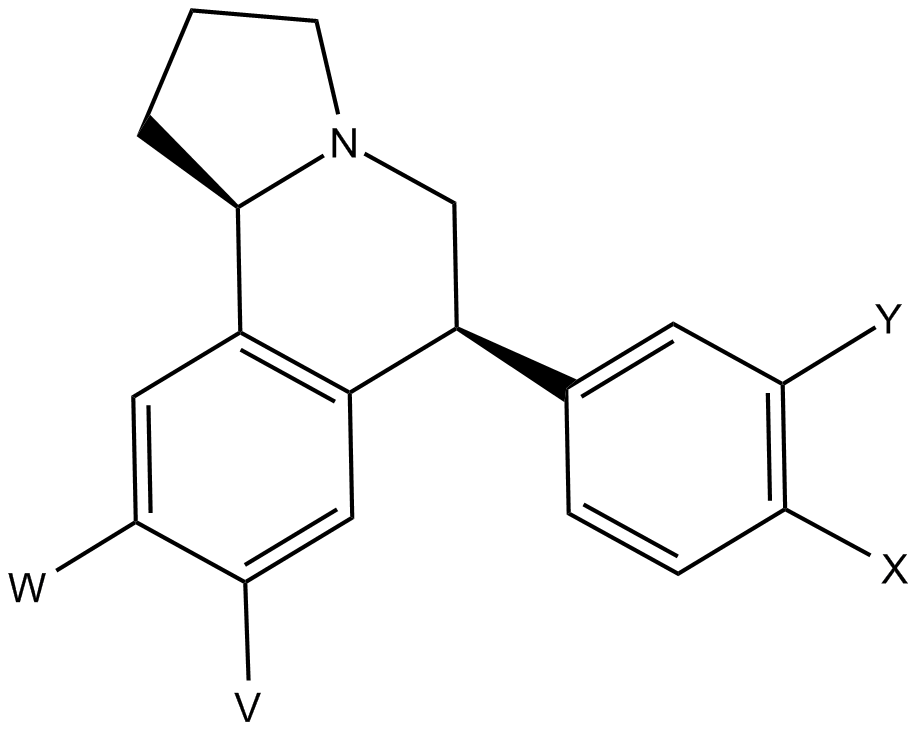

X	Y	V	W	MA (mg/kg)	ptosis (mg/kg)	DA (nM)	NE (nM)	5-HT (nM)
H	H	H	H	0.34 (0.59)	0.07 (0.05)	11.3 (4.4)	0.60 (0.37)	23.5 (12.4)
H	H	OMe	OMe	15.1	3.8	15.0	53.7	1540
H	H	OH	OH	0.87	0.53	43.5	10.5	124
OMe	H	H	H	0.27	0.03	5.2	0.79	1.7
OH	H	H	H	0.40	0.09	5.1	0.74	3.2
H	OMe	H	H	~0.2	0.07	15.8	0.65	7.2
H	OH	H	H	>10	0.11	10.1	0.85	24.6
H	H	H	OMe	no data	no data	2.8	2.2	4.5
OMe	OMe	H	H	2.0	0.13	71.9	3.4	18.1
OH	OH	H	H	0.19	0.11	10.1	0.81	33.1
Cl	H	H	H	0.55	0.34	1.7	0.16	1.5
H	Cl	H	H	~0.1	<0.1	2.5	0.45	7.3
Cl	H	H	Cl	37.4	~4	3.2	3.2	2.9
Cl	Cl	H	H	0.39	0.14	0.99	0.68	1.8
F	H	H	H	~0.2	~0.2	8.4	1.4	8.5
F	H	H	F	>30	0.05	7.7	0.55	4.4
NH_{2}	H	H	H	~0.2	~0.01	0.86	0.20	44
SMe	H	H	H	>30 (no data)	0.30 (no data)	41.2 (23.5)	3.0 (1.8)	0.62 (0.39)
Ethynyl	H	H	H	~0.5	~0.5	2.6	0.94	1.0
diclofensine						10.9	8.8	10.3
WIN-25978						7.2	41.1	879

This is a collection of all of the analogs that had favorable biological activity or an interesting substitution pattern.

All compounds are racemic preparations with the exception that brackets are for pure (+) enantiomer.

=== Para-Fluoro ===
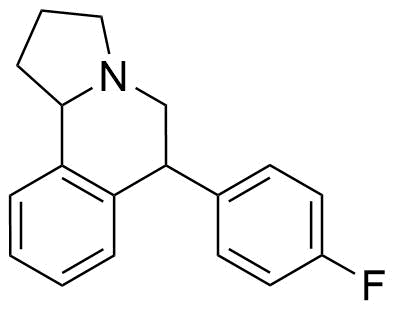
JNJ-7925476 according to AK Dutta

AK Dutta, et al. draws JNJ-7925476 with a fluorine in lieu of an ethynyl, without specifying the exact stereochemistry, e.g.

For JNJ-7925476 itself, the Ethynyl group is made from the p-iodo group (i.e. PC9951513), although no actual attempt was made by any of the authors to characterize this into the SAR list of quantitative data. Like RTI-55 it was made prepared with radiolabelled iodine is an excellent way to scan the brain using positron emission tomography.

Aloke Dutta's compound can also be made in radiolabelled form, ala Flubatine.

Instead of alkyne, one can also replace the halogen with cyanide (nitrile), ala citalopram. Although not inputted into the tablet above, this was another one of the McNeal analogues.

=== Ring size structure activity relationships ===
Expanding the ring size from pyrrolidino to piperidinyl resulted in compounds that were impotent, although contracting the ring size from 5 → 4 did not have negative repercussions on the resultant potency.

== Chemistry ==
The N-acyliminium cyclization route; and the mandelic acid and styrene oxide route were employed for most of the target compounds.

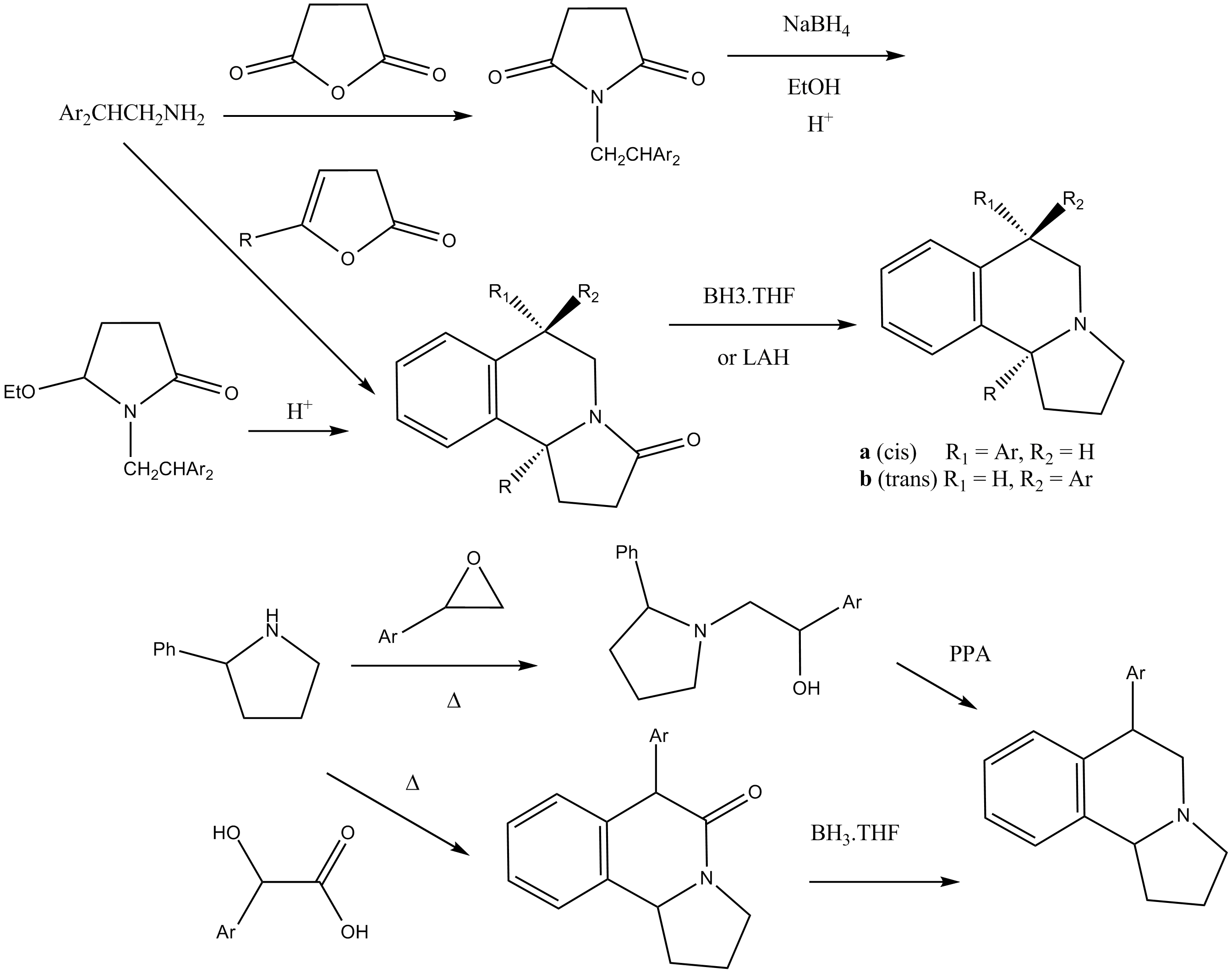
Pyrroloisoquinoline Synthesis

The SS/RR diastereomers as the principle products if one follows the above steps.

It is possible to epimerize the product to the desired RS/SR diastereomers, but the equilibrium is only 50/50.

Hence, alternative synthetic methods needed to be sought to obtain the desired isomer/s in diastereochemical excess.

If instead of an "aryl" group, a tert-butyl or a cyclohexyl was used, then it was possible to alter the stereochemical discourse of the reaction.

=== Stereoselective reaction ===

Hydrogenation of an appropriately positioned olefin might be expected to work.

But the ketone cannot be reduced to an alcohol because it is part of an amide.
