= Bimatoprost/timolol =

Combination drug

Combination of
- Bimatoprost: Prostaglandin analogue
- Timolol: Beta blocker

Clinical data
- Trade names: Ganfort
- AHFS/Drugs.com: UK Drug Information
- Routes of administration: Eye drops
- ATC code: S01ED51 (WHO)

Legal status
- Legal status: UK: POM (Prescription only); EU: Rx-only; In general: ℞ (Prescription only)

Identifiers
- CAS Number: 946163-60-6
- KEGG: D10840

Bimatoprost/timolol, sold under the brand name Ganfort, is a medication for the treatment of certain conditions involving high pressure in the eyes, specifically open angle glaucoma and ocular hypertension. It is available as eye drops.

It was approved for medical use in the European Union in May 2006.

== Medical uses ==
Bimatoprost/timolol is used for the treatment of open angle glaucoma or ocular hypertension in people for whom single-component eye drops such as prostaglandin analogs or beta blockers are insufficient.

== Contraindications ==
Because of the timolol component, which is a beta blocker, the drops are contraindicated in people with lung problems such as asthma or severe chronic obstructive pulmonary disease, or with heart problems such as sinus bradycardia (slow heartbeat), sick sinus syndrome, sino-atrial block, or severe atrioventricular block.

== Adverse effects ==
The most common side effect is conjunctival hyperaemia (increased bloodflow in the outer layer of the eye), which occurs in over 10% of people taking the drug. Side effects in less than 10% of people include other eye problems such as itching, foreign body sensation or dry eye, as headache or hyperpigmentation (darkening) of the skin around the eye.

Hyperpigmentation is an adverse effect of bimatoprost, while the others are fairly common for eye drops in general.

== Interactions ==
No formal interaction studies have been done with bimatoprost/timolol eye drops. As timolol (in tablet form) can be used to lower blood pressure and heart rhythm, it might add to the effect of other antihypertensive (pressure lowering) drugs. Also, drugs that block the liver enzyme CYP2D6 may increase the effects of timolol.

== Pharmacology ==
Bimatoprost is a prostaglandin analog and lowers pressure in the eye by increased draining of aqueous humor via the trabecular meshwork. Timolol is a nonselective beta blocker, which lowers eye pressure by reducing aqueous humor production.
