= Travoprost/timolol =

Fixed-dose combination medication

Combination of
- Travoprost: Prostaglandin analog
- Timolol: Beta-blocker

Clinical data
- Trade names: Duotrav
- AHFS/Drugs.com: UK Drug Information
- Pregnancy category: AU: C
- Routes of administration: Eye drops
- ATC code: S01ED51 (WHO)

Legal status
- Legal status: AU: S4 (Prescription only); UK: POM (Prescription only); EU: Rx-only

Identifiers
- CAS Number: 874755-80-3
- KEGG: D09815

Travoprost/timolol, sold under the brand name Duotrav among others, is a fixed-dose combination medication used for the treatment of glaucoma. It contains travoprost and timolol maleate.

It was authorized for medical use in the European Union in April 2006.
