= Glaucoma medication =

Eye condition medication

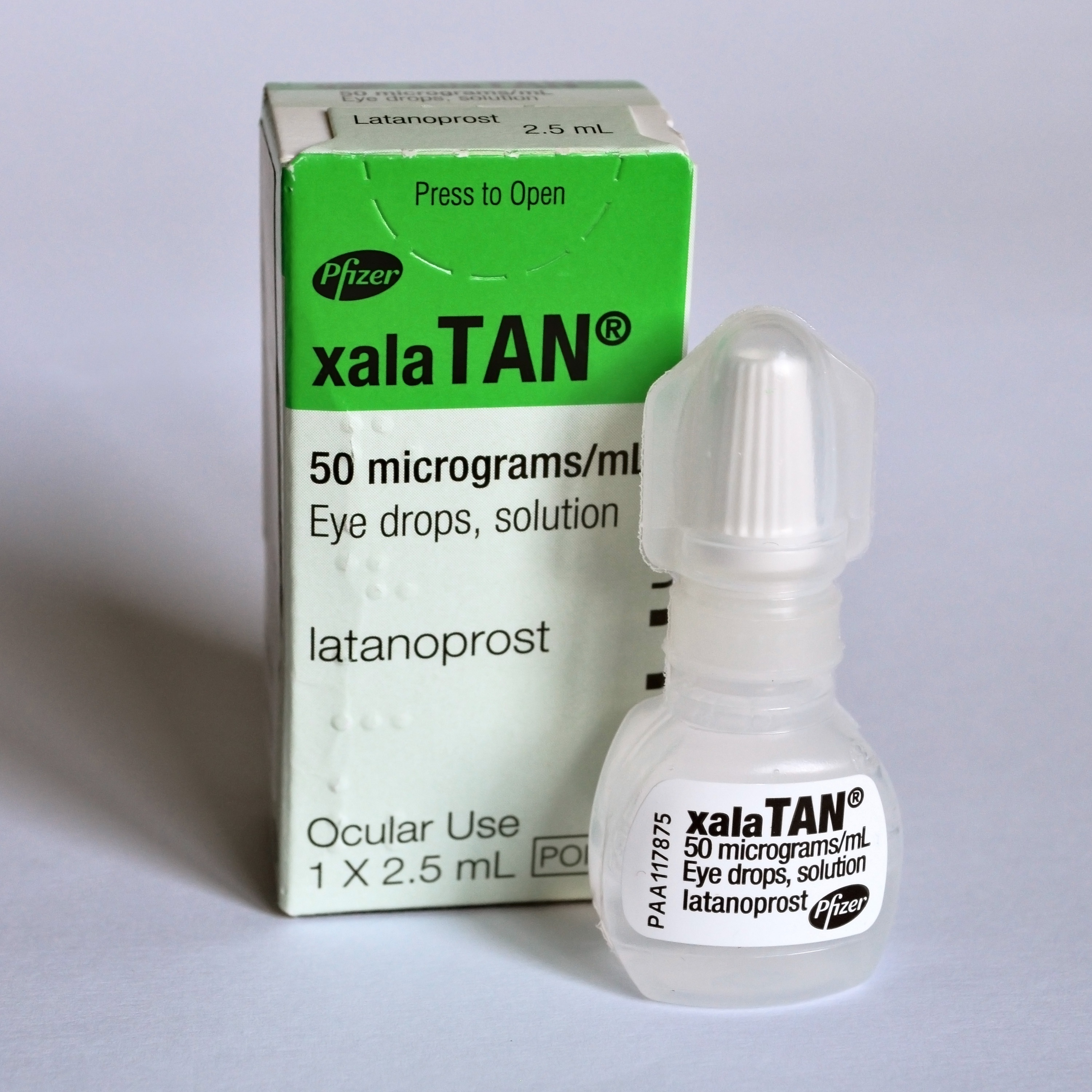
- Latanoprost
- Specialty: Ophthalmology

Glaucoma medication is divided into groups based on chemical structure and pharmacologic action. The goal of currently available glaucoma therapy is to preserve visual function by lowering intraocular pressure (IOP) in patients that have an increased intraocular pressure.

== Medical uses ==
Agents in common clinical use include:

- Prostaglandin analogs
- Parasympathomimetic (miotic) agents, including cholinergic and anticholinesterase agents
- Carbonic anhydrase inhibitors (oral and topical)
- Adrenergic antagonists (nonselective and selective Beta1-antagonists)
- Alpha 2 agonists
- Hyperosmotic agents
- Nitric oxide donators
- Rho kinase inhibitors

When comparing people with primary open-angle glaucoma and ocular hypertension, medical intraocular pressure lowering treatment slowed down the progression of visual field loss.

== Comparison table ==
Name	Other names	Mechanism of action	Dosage	IOP decrease	Side effects
Prostaglandin analogs
Latanoprost	Xalatan	Increased USO (uveoscleral outflow )	Once daily	25-32%	pigmentation of eyelashes, eyelid skin pigmentation, hyperemia (red eye), flu-like symptoms (joint/muscle pain and headache)
Bimatoprost	Lumigan	Increased USO (uveoscleral outflow )	Once daily		blurred vision, eyelid redness, eye discomfort, permanently darken iris, darken/thicken eyelashes
Travoprost	Travatan	Increased USO (uveoscleral outflow )	Once daily		blurred vision, eyelid redness, eye discomfort, permanently darken iris, darken/thicken eyelashes
Beta blockers
Timolol	Timoptic	Decrease aqueous production	Every 12 hours	20-30%	bronchospasm, bradycardia, depression, impotence
Betaxolol	Betoptic	Decrease aqueous production	Every 12 hours	15-20%	Fewer pulmonary complications due to selective Beta blockage
Adrenergic agents
Brimonidine	Alphagan	Decrease aqueous production, increase USO	every 8–12 hours	20-30%	blurring, foreign body sensation, eyelid edema, dryness, headache, fatigue, hypotension, depression, insomnia
Miotics
Pilocarpine	Isoptocarpine, Pilocar	Increase trabecular outflow	Every 6–12 hours	15-25%	posterior synechia, keratitis, miosis, brow ache, cataract, myopia, retinal tear, dermatitis, increased salivation
Carbonic anhydrase inhibitors
Dorzolamide	Trusopt	Decrease aqueous production	Every 8–12 hours	15-20%	eye irritation, bitter taste
Brinzolamide	Azopt	Decrease aqueous production	Every 8–12 hours	15-20%	eye irritation, bitter taste
Acetazolamide	Diamox	Decrease aqueous production	Every 6–12 hours	15-20%	malaise, depression, weight loss, kidney stones

== Combinations ==
Fotil is a combination drug consisting of:

- Pilocarpine, a parasympathomimetic
- Timolol, a beta-adrenergic receptor antagonist
