= Brimonidine/timolol =

Combination drug

Combination of
- Brimonidine: α_{2} adrenergic agonist
- Timolol: Beta blocker

Clinical data
- Trade names: Combigan
- AHFS/Drugs.com: Professional Drug Facts
- Pregnancy category: AU: C
- Routes of administration: Eye drops
- ATC code: S01ED51 (WHO)

Legal status
- Legal status: AU: S4 (Prescription only); US: ℞-only

Identifiers
- CAS Number: 952743-07-6
- PubChem CID: 11387895
- KEGG: D10298
- CompTox Dashboard (EPA): DTXSID20915041

Brimonidine/timolol, sold under the brand name Combigan among others, is a fixed-dose combination medication eye drop used for the treatment of glaucoma. It is a combination of brimonidine (an α_{2} adrenergic agonist) and timolol (a β adrenergic blocker).

In 2020, it was the 256th most commonly prescribed medication in the United States, with more than 1 million prescriptions.

== Medical uses ==
Brimonidine/timolol is used to reduce elevated intraocular pressure (IOP) in people with glaucoma or ocular hypertension who need adjunctive or replacement therapy.

== Adverse effects ==
The most common adverse effects affecting 5 to 15% of the patients include allergic conjunctivitis, conjunctival folliculosis, conjunctival hyperemia, eye pruritus, ocular burning, and stinging. 1 to 5% of the patients in clinical trials experienced asthenia, blepharitis, corneal erosion, depression, epiphora, eye discharge, eye dryness, eye irritation, eye pain, eyelid edema, eyelid erythema, eyelid pruritus, foreign body sensation, headache, hypertension, oral dryness, somnolence, superficial punctate keratitis, and visual disturbance.

== Contraindications ==
Contraindications of brimonidine/timolol include the following: reactive airway disease including bronchial asthma, a history of bronchial asthma, severe chronic obstructive pulmonary disease, sinus bradycardia, secondary or third degree atrioventricular block, overt cardiac failure, cardiogenic shock, age less than 2 years, and hypersensitivity to any component of brimonidine/timolol.

== Pharmacology ==
Brimonidine/timolol is composed of brimonidine, a selective alpha-2 adrenergic receptor agonist, and timolol, a non-selective beta-adrenergic receptor inhibitor. Elevated IOP is considered the only modifiable risk factor in the pathogenesis of glaucoma. Brimonidine exerts its ocular hypotensive effect by decreasing aqueous humor production and increasing uveoscleral outflow, while timolol acts by reducing aqueous humor production. Brimonidine/timolol has a fast onset of action, and the peak IOP lowering effect occurs at two hours after administration.

== History ==
=== Preclinical studies ===
No carcinogenic effects were found with brimonidine tartrate in mice or rats. With timolol maleate, 300 mg/kg/day in rats (equivalent to about 42,000 times systemic exposure following the maximum recommended ocular dose in human [MRHOD]) was associated with significantly increased incidence of adrenal pheochromocytomas in a two-year study; in a lifetime study in mice, 500 mg/kg/day (equivalent to about 71,000 times systemic exposure following the MRHOD) but not 5 or 50 mg/kg/day (about 700 or 7,000 times systemic exposure following the MRHOD) of timolol maleate was associated with significantly increased incidence of benign and malignant pulmonary tumors, benign uterine polyps and mammary adenocarcinomas.

Neither brimonidine tartrate nor timolol maleate was mutagenic in vitro and in vivo studies. Reproduction and fertility studies in rats did not reveal any adverse effects on male or female fertility with brimonidine tartrate or timolol maleate.

=== Clinical trials ===
Two prospective, randomized, double-blinded, phase III clinical trials were conducted at 53 sites in the United States to compare the IOP-lowering efficacy and safety of 0.2% brimonidine tartrate/0.5% timolol maleate fixed combination twice daily with 0.2% brimonidine tartrate three times daily or 0.5% timolol maleate twice daily in patients aged 18 or older who had ocular hypertension or glaucoma. When assessed over a 3-month period, pooled results from a total of 1159 patients showed significantly greater mean IOP decrease from baseline with the brimonidine/timolol combination (4.9-7.6 mmHg) than with brimonidine monotherapy (3.1-5.5 mmHg) or timolol monotherapy (4.3-6.2 mmHg) across all follow-up visits. Similar efficacy results were reported during 12-month follow-up: mean IOP decrease from baseline was 4.4-7.6 mmHg with brimonidine/timolol combination, compared to 2.7-5.5 mmHg with brimonidine and 3.9-6.2 mmHg with timolol. The incidence of treatment-related adverse events with the brimonidine/timolol combination was lower than that with brimonidine monotherapy but higher than that with timolol monotherapy.

A 12-week prospective, randomized, double-blinded study in 371 glaucoma and ocular hypertension patients with inadequate IOP control on monotherapy compared the efficacy and safety of 0.2% brimonidine tartrate/0.5% timolol fixed combination twice daily with the concomitant use of 0.2% brimonidine tartrate twice daily and timolol 0.5% twice daily. The IOP-lowering effect of the fixed combination group was shown to be non-inferior to that of concomitant therapy. Incidence of adverse events was similar between groups.

== Society and culture ==
=== Brand names ===
Allergan holds at least six active patents protecting Combigan from generic competition. Several generic companies challenged the validity of the patents and filed Abbreviated New Drug Applications (ANDA) seeking market entry. Allergan responded by filing a lawsuit against the ANDA filers. In Allergan, Inc. v. Sandoz, Inc., the US Court of Appeals for the Federal Circuit ruled that Allergan's composition-related patent claims were invalid based on obviousness, because brimonidine and timolol had already been marketed in the claimed concentrations. However, Allergan's method claim (US Patent No. 7,030,149), which states "reducing the number of daily topical ophthalmic doses of brimonidine administered topically to an eye of a person in need thereof for the treatment of glaucoma or ocular hypertension from 3 to 2 times a day without loss of efficacy", was held to be non-obvious. As a result, generic companies are prevented from marketing generic versions of Combigan until its patent expiration in 2022.

On February 2, 2022, Carlisle Medical issued a press release announcing that Apotex Corporation has launched the authorized generic version of Combigan (Brimonidine Timolol OPSO 0.2%/0.5%) in the United States subsequent to the FDA'a approval of the generic on December 13, 2021. On April 14, 2022, Novartis' Sandoz, Inc. issue a press release announcing the US launch of its generic combination.
