= Inotek Pharmaceuticals =

Inotek Pharmaceuticals is a clinical-stage biopharmaceutical company based in Lexington, Massachusetts focused on the discovery, development and commercialization of novel therapies to treat glaucoma and other serious diseases of the eye.

The Company's lead product candidate, trabodenoson (formerly known as INO-8875), is being evaluated for the treatment of elevated intraocular pressure associated with primary open-angle glaucoma (POAG) and ocular hypertension (OHT). Trabodenoson has completed Phase 1, 2, and 3 clinical trials in subjects with OHT and POAG. Inotek is developing trabodenoson as a monotherapy delivered via eye drop, as well as a fixed-dose combination (FDC) with latanoprost, one of the leading current treatments for OHT and POAG.
