= Prostin =

Prostin may refer to:

- Prostin E2, a trade name for a preparation of prostaglandin E2
- Prostin VR, a trade name for a preparation of prostaglandin E1
- Prostin F2 Alpha, a trade name for a preparation of prostaglandin F2alpha
