= Prostaglandin-E2 9-reductase =

Class of enzymes

prostaglandin-E_{2} 9-reductase

Identifiers
- EC no.: 1.1.1.189
- CAS no.: 42613-35-4

Databases
- IntEnz: IntEnz view
- BRENDA: BRENDA entry
- ExPASy: NiceZyme view
- KEGG: KEGG entry
- MetaCyc: metabolic pathway
- PRIAM: profile
- PDB structures: RCSB PDB PDBe PDBsum
- Gene Ontology: AmiGO / QuickGO
Search
- PMC: articles
- PubMed: articles
- NCBI: proteins

In enzymology, a prostaglandin-E_{2} 9-reductase (EC 1.1.1.189) is an enzyme that catalyzes the chemical reaction

prostaglandin E2
+ NADP^{+}
H^{+}
H^{+}
prostaglandin F2α
+ NADPH

Thus, the two substrates of this enzyme are prostaglandin E_{2} and oxidised nicotinamide adenine dinucleotide phosphate (NADP^{+}). Its products are prostaglandin F_{2α}, reduced NADPH, and a proton.

This enzyme belongs to the family of oxidoreductases, specifically those acting on the CH-OH group of donor with NAD^{+} or NADP^{+} as acceptor. The systematic name of this enzyme class is (5Z,13E)-(15S)-9alpha,11alpha,15-trihydroxyprosta-5,13-dienoate:NADP^{+} 9-oxidoreductase. Other names in common use include PGE_{2}-9-OR, reductase, 15-hydroxy-9-oxoprostaglandin, 9-keto-prostaglandin E_{2} reductase, 9-ketoprostaglandin reductase, PGE-9-ketoreductase, PGE_{2} 9-oxoreductase, PGE_{2} reductase-9-ketoreductase, prostaglandin 9-ketoreductase, prostaglandin E 9-ketoreductase, and prostaglandin E_{2} reductase-9-oxoreductase. This enzyme participates in arachidonic acid metabolism.

== Structural studies ==
As of late 2007, 3 structures have been solved for this class of enzymes, with PDB accession codes 1Q13, 1Q5M, and 2PFG.
