= SDZ-GLC-756 =

Clinical data
- Drug class: Dopaminergic drug; adrenergic drug; serotonergic drug; putative glaucoma medication

Identifiers
- IUPAC name: (3R,4aR,10aR)-1-methyl-3-(pyridin-2-ylsulfanylmethyl)-3,4,4a,5,10,10a-hexahydro-2H-benzo[g]quinoline

Chemical and physical data
- Formula: C_{20}H_{24}N_{2}S
- Molar mass: 324.49 g·mol^{−1}
- 3D model (JSmol): Interactive image
- SMILES: CN1C[C@@H](C[C@H]2[C@H]1CC3=CC=CC=C3C2)CSC4=CC=CC=N4
- InChI: InChI=1S/C20H24N2S/c1-22-13-15(14-23-20-8-4-5-9-21-20)10-18-11-16-6-2-3-7-17(16)12-19(18)22/h2-9,15,18-19H,10-14H2,1H3/t15-,18-,19-/m1/s1; Key:JVCCQRRESBKGJS-ATZDWAIDSA-N

SDZ-GLC-756 is a mixed-action dopaminergic drug that has been proposed for use in the treatment of eye diseases associated with high intraocular pressure. It is referred to as GLC756 in modern sources.

== Pharmacology ==
GLC756 acts primarily as a dopaminergic, serotonergic, and adrenergic agent with a broad spectrum of action; the reduction in TNF-alpha levels induced by GLC756 is achieved through its antagonistic effect on α_{2}-adrenergic receptors and its agonistic effect on β_{2} adrenergiс receptors. In addition, it also exhibits antagonism toward the dopamine receptor D_{1} and an agonistic effect on the dopamine receptor D_{2}; it has also been shown to bind to α_{1}-adrenergic and β_{1-}adrenergic receptors, to dopamine receptors D_{4}, and to numerous subtypes of 5-hydroxytryptamine receptors, such as 5-HT_{1A}, 5-HT_{2C}, 5-HT_{1D}, and 5-HT_{2A}. GLC756 has been described in the literature as an inhibitor of leukotriene C_{4} release and has also been shown to significantly increase cellular cAMP levels.
