= Prostaglandin F receptor =

Protein found in humans

PTGFR

Identifiers
- Aliases: PTGFR, FP, Prostaglandin F receptor
- External IDs: OMIM: 600563; MGI: 97796; GeneCards: PTGFR

Gene location (Human)
Chr.	Chromosome 1 (human)
Band	1p31.1	Start	78,303,884 bp
Band	1p31.1	End	78,540,701 bp

Gene location (Mouse)
Chr.	Chromosome 3 (mouse)
Band	3 H3|3 76.96 cM	Start	151,502,139 bp
Band	3 H3|3 76.96 cM	End	151,543,267 bp
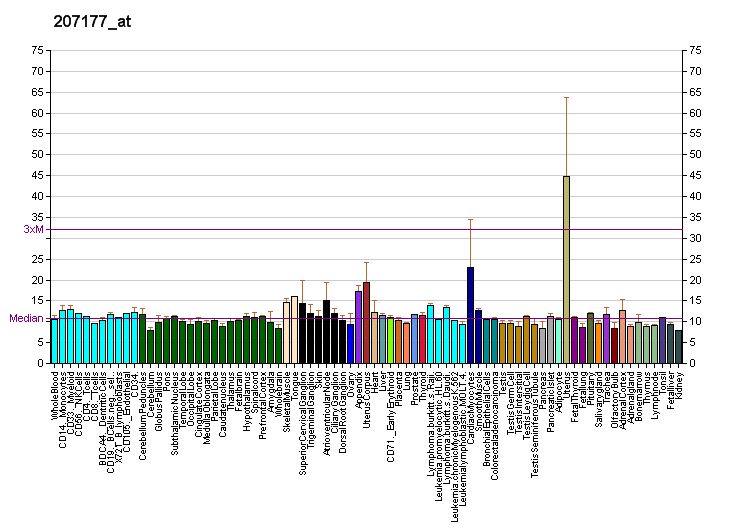
RNA expression pattern
Bgee	Human / Mouse (ortholog); Top expressed in: Achilles tendon; gastric mucosa; tibial nerve; bronchial epithelial cell; synovial joint; smooth muscle tissue; stromal cell of endometrium; urethra; skin of hip; testicle / Top expressed in: lumbar spinal ganglion; lower jaw; incisor; Meckel's cartilage; mandibular molars; right kidney; aortic valve; conjunctival fornix; urethra; female urethra; More reference expression data
BioGPS	More reference expression data
Gene ontology
Molecular function	prostaglandin F receptor activity; G protein-coupled receptor activity; signal transducer activity
Cellular component	cytoplasm; integral component of membrane; extracellular region; plasma membrane; integral component of plasma membrane; membrane
Biological process	G protein-coupled receptor signaling pathway; response to lipopolysaccharide; positive regulation of gene expression; response to estradiol; negative regulation of apoptotic process; cellular response to prostaglandin D stimulus; calcium-mediated signaling using intracellular calcium source; birth; positive regulation of cell population proliferation; signal transduction; inflammatory response; adenylate cyclase-activating G protein-coupled receptor signaling pathway; positive regulation of cytosolic calcium ion concentration
Sources:Amigo / QuickGO
Orthologs
Databases	NCBI: entry; OMA: entry
Species	Human	Mouse
Entrez	5737	19220
Ensembl	ENSG00000122420	ENSMUSG00000028036
UniProt	P43088	P43117
RefSeq (mRNA)	NM_000959; NM_001039585	NM_008966
RefSeq (protein)	NP_000950; NP_001034674	NP_032992
Location (UCSC)	Chr 1: 78.3 – 78.54 Mb	Chr 3: 151.5 – 151.54 Mb
PubMed search
- Wikidata
View/Edit Human	View/Edit Mouse

Prostaglandin F receptor (FP) is a receptor belonging to the prostaglandin (PG) group of receptors. FP binds to and mediates the biological actions of prostaglandin F_{2α} (PGF_{2α}). It is encoded in humans by the PTGFR gene.

== Gene ==
The PTGFR gene is located on human chromosome 1 at position p31.1 (i.e. 1p31.1), contains 7 exons, and codes for a G protein coupled receptor (GPCR) of the rhodopsin-like receptor family, Subfamily A14 (see rhodopsin-like receptors#Subfamily A14). PTGFR is expressed as two alternatively spliced transcript variants encoding different isoforms, FP_{A} and FP_{B}, which have different C-terminal lengths. MicroRNA miR-590-3p binds to the Three prime untranslated region of the FP gene to repress its translation. miR-590-3p thus appears to be a negative regulator of FP expression in various cell types.

== Expression ==
In humans, FP mRNA and/or protein is highly expressed in the uterine myometrium; throughout the eye (endothelium and smooth muscle cells of blood vessels of the iris), ciliary body and choroid plexus; ciliary muscle (circular muscle, collagenous connective tissues; sclera; and ovarian (follicles and corpus luteum). Studies in mice indicate that FP mRNA and/or protein is expressed in diverse tissues including the kidney (distal tubules), uterus, and ovary (Luteal cells of corpus luteum.

== Ligands ==
=== Activating ligands ===
The FP receptor is the least selective of the prostanoid receptors in that it is responsive to PGD_{2} and to a lesser extent PGE2 at concentrations close to those of PGF_{2α}. Standard prostanoids have the following relative efficacies as receptor ligands in binding to and activating FP: PGF_{2α}>PGD_{2}>PGE_{2}>PGI_{2}=TXA2. In typical binding studies, PGF_{2α} has one-half maximal binding and cell stimulating actions at ~1 nanomolar whereas PGD_{2} and PGE_{2} are ~5- to 10-fold and 10-100-fold weaker than this. The synthetic analogs that like PGF_{2α} act as selective receptor agonists of FP viz., cloprostenol, flupostenol, latanoprost, and tafluprost (acid form) have FP binding affinities and stimulating potencies similar to PGF_{2α} while others as enprostil, sulprostone, U46619, carbacyclin, and iloprost are considerably weaker FP agonists. Fluprostenol is a widely used clinically as a selective FP receptor agonist; latanoprost is a suitable substitute.

=== Inhibiting ligands ===
Currently, there are no selective receptor antagonists for FP.

== Mechanism of cell activation ==
FP is classified as a contractile type of prostenoid receptor based on its ability, upon activation, to contract certain smooth muscle preparations and smooth muscle-containing tissues such as those of the uterus. When bound to PGF_{2α} or other of its agonists, FP mobilizes primarily G proteins containing the Gq alpha subunit bound to of the Gq-Gβγ complex(i.e. Gqβγ). Gqβγ then dissociate into its Gq and Gβγ components which act to regulate cell signaling pathways. In particular, Gq stimulates cell signal pathways involving a) phospholipase C/IP3/cell Ca^{2+} mobilization/diacylglycerol/protein kinase Cs; calmodulin-modulated myosin light chain kinase; RAF/MEK/Mitogen-activated protein kinases; PKC/Ca^{2+}/Calcineurin/Nuclear factor of activated T-cells; and the EGF cellular receptor. In certain cells, activation of FP also stimulates G_{12}/G_{13}-Gβγ G proteins to activate the Rho family of GTPases signaling proteins and Gi-Gβγ G proteins to activateRaf/MEK/mitogen-activated kinase pathways.

== Functions ==
Studies using animals genetically engineered to lack FP and examining the actions of EP_{4} receptor agonists in animals as well as animal and human tissues indicate that this receptor serves various functions. It has been regarded as the most successful therapeutic target among the 9 prostanoid receptors.

=== Eye ===
Animal and human studies have found that the stimulation of FP receptors located on Ciliary muscle and trabecular meshwork cells of the eye widens the drainage channels (termed the uveoscleral pathway) that they form. This increases the outflow of aqueous humor from the anterior chamber of the eye through Schlemm's canal to outside of the eyeball. The increase in aqueous humor outflow triggered by FP receptor activation reduces Intraocular pressure and underlies the widespread usage of FP receptor agonists to treat glaucoma. László Z. Bitó is credited with making critical studies to define this intraocular pressure-relieving pathway. Three FP receptor agonists are approved for clinical use in the USA viz., travoprost, latanoprost, and bimatoprost, and two additional agonists are prescribed in Europe and Asia viz., unoprostone and tafluprost.

=== Hair growth ===
Since FP receptors are expresses in human dermal papillae and the use of FP agonists to treat glaucoma has as a side-effect an increase in eyelash growth, it has been suggested that FP agonists may be useful for treating baldness. This is supported by studies in the stump-tailed Macaque primate model of androgen-induced scalp alopecia which have found that the FP agonist, latanoprost, promotes scalp hair growth. These studies have not yet been translated into baldness therapy in humans.

=== Reproduction ===
FP receptor activation contributes to the regression of the corpus luteum and thereby the estrous cycle in many species of farm animals. However, it does not make these contributions in mice and its contribution to these functions in humans is controversial. The receptor has been in use as a target for decades to regulate the estrous cycle as well as to induce labor in pregnant farm animals FP gene knockout in female mice blocks parturition. That is, these FP-/- mice fail to enter labor even if induced by oxytocin due to a failure in copus luteum regression and consequential failure to stop secreting progesterone (declining progesterone levels trigger labor). Studies with monkey and human tissues allow that FP receptors may have a similar function in humans.

=== Skin pigmentation ===
One side effect of applying FP receptor agonists to eyelashes in humans is the development of hyperpigmentation at nearby skin sites. Follow-up studies of this side effect indicated than human skin pigment-forming melanocyte cells express FP receptors and respond to FP receptor agonists by increasing their dendricites (projections to other cells) as well as to increase their tyrosinase activity. Since skin melanocytes use their dendrites to transfer the skin pigment melanin to skin keratinocytes thereby darkening skin and since tyrosinase is the rate-limiting enzyme in the synthesis of melanin, these studies suggest that FP receptor activation may be a useful means to increase skin pigmentation.

=== Bone ===
PGF_{2α} triggers the NFATC2 pathway stimulating skeletal muscle cell growth. PGF_{2α}, shown or presumed to operate by activating FP receptors, has complex effects on bone osteoclasts and osteoblasts to regulate bone remodeling. However, further studies on the impact of the PGF_{2α}-FP axis on bone are needed to better understand the pathophysiology underlying bone turnover and to identify this axis as a novel pharmacological target for the treatment of bone disorders and diseases.

=== Inflammation and allergy ===
Unlike other prostaglandin receptors which have been shown in numerous studies to contribute to inflammatory and allergic responses in animal models, there are few studies on the function of FP receptors in these responses. Gene knockout studies in mice clearly show that FP mediates the late phase (thromboxane receptor mediates the early phase) of the tachycardia response to the pro-inflammatory agent, lipopolysaccharide. PTGFR knockout mice also show a reduction in the development of pulmonary fibrosis normally caused by microbial invasion or bleomycin treatment. Finally, administration of PGF_{2α} to mice causes an acute inflammatory response and elevated biosynthesis of PGF_{2α} has been found in the tissues of patients with rheumatoid arthritis, psoriatic arthritis, and other forms of arthritis. While much further work is needed, these studies indicate that PGF_{2α}-FP axis has some pro-inflammatory and anti-inflammatory effects in animals that may translate to humans. The axis may likewise play role in human allergic responses: PGF_{2α} causes airway constriction in normal and asthmatic humans and its presence in human sputum is related to sputum eosinophil levels.

=== Cardiovascular system ===
PGF_{2α} simulates an increase in systolic blood pressure in wild type but not FP(−/−) mice. Furthermore, FP(-/-) mice have significantly lower blood pressure, lower plasma renin levels, and lower plasma angiotensin-1 levels than wild-type mice, and FP agonists have a negative inotropic effect to weaken the strength of heart beating in rats. Finally, FP(−/−) mice deficient in the LDL receptor exhibit significantly less atherosclerosis than FP(+/+) LDL receptor-deficient mice. Activation of FP thus has pathophysiological consequences for the cardiovascular system relative to blood pressure, cardiac function, and atherosclerosis in animal models. The mechanism behind these FP effects and their relevancy to humans have not been elucidated.

== Clinical significance ==
=== Therapeutic ===
==== Glaucoma ====
FP receptor agonists, specifically latanoprost, travoprost, bimatoprost, and tafluprost, are currently used as first-line drugs to treat glaucoma and other causes of intra-ocular hypertension (see Glaucoma#Medication).

==== Hair growth ====
The FP receptor agonist, bimatoprost, in the form of an 0.03% ophthalmic solution termed Latisse, is approved by the US Food and Drug Administration to treat hypotrichosis of the eyelashes, in particular to darken and lengthen eyelashes for cosmetic purposes. Eyelid hypotrichosis caused by

==== Veterinary uses ====
FP receptor agonists are used as highly effective agents to synchronize the oestrus cycles of farm animals and thereby to facilitate animal husbandry.

=== Translational studies ===
==== Hair growth ====
Eyelash hypotrichosis due to the autoimmune disease alopecia areata, or to chemotherapy, have been successfully treated with FP agonists in small translational research studies. In a randomized, double-blind, placebo-controlled pilot study of 16 men with male pattern baldness (also termed androgenetic alopecia) topical application of the FP agonist, latanoprost, for 24 weeks produced a significant increase in scalp hair density. Despite these findings, however, a case report of one woman with female pattern hair loss found that injection of FP agonist bimatoprost failed to influence hair growth.

==== Skin pigmentation ====
In preliminary studies, three Korean patients with periorbital vitiligo (i.e. skin blanching) were treated topically with the FP receptor agonist, latanoprost, for two months; the three patients experienced 20%, 50%, and >90% re-pigmentation of their vitiligo lesions. Fourteen patients with hypopigmented in their scarreed tissues were treated with the FP receptor agonist, bimatoprost, applied topically plus laser therapy and topical tretinoin or pimecrolimus. Most patients demonstrated significant improvement in their hypopigmentation, but the isolated effect of topical bimatoprost was not evaluated. These studies allow that FP receptor agonists may be useful for treating hypopigmentation such as occurs in scar tissue as well as diseases like vitiligo, tinea versicolor, and pityriasis alba.

=== Genomic studies ===
The single-nucleotide polymorphism (SNP) A/G variant, rs12731181, located in the Three prime untranslated region of PTGFR has been associated with increased risk for hypertension in individuals from southern Germany; while this association was not replicated in other European populations, it was found in a Korean population. This SNP variant reduces the binging of MicroRNA miR-590-3p to PTGFR; since this binding represses translation of this gene, the rs127231181 variant acts to increase expression of the FP receptor. PTGFR SNP variants rs6686438 and rs10786455s were associated with positive and SNP variants rs3753380, rs6672484, and rs11578155 in PTGFR were associated with negative responses to latanoprost for the treatment of Open-Angle Glaucoma in a Spanish population. PTGFR SNP variants rs3753380 and rs3766355 were associated with a reduce response to latanoprost in a Chinese population study.

== See also ==
- Prostaglandin F2 alpha
- Prostaglandin receptors
- Eicosanoid receptor
