= Latanoprost/timolol =

Combination drug

Combination of
- Latanoprost: Prostaglandin
- Timolol: Beta blocker

Clinical data
- Trade names: Xalacom
- Routes of administration: Eye drops
- ATC code: S01ED51 (WHO)

Legal status
- Legal status: AU: S4 (Prescription only); UK: POM (Prescription only)

Identifiers
- PubChem CID: 56841581
- KEGG: D07505
- CompTox Dashboard (EPA): DTXSID401005716

Latanoprost/timolol, sold under the brand name Xalacom, is a combination drug used for the treatment of glaucoma, consisting of latanoprost (increase uveoscleral outflow of aqueous humor) and timolol (a beta blocker decreasing the production of aqueous fluid).

== Society and culture ==
=== Brand names ===
In some countries, Xalacom is marketed by Viatris after Upjohn was spun off from Pfizer.
