= Tapros =

Tapros is the trade name of two different drugs:

- Tafluprost, eye drops for the treatment of glaucoma
- Leuprorelin acetate, an anti-cancer drug
