= Prostaglandin F synthase =

Monomeric wild-type protein

prostaglandin-F synthase

Identifiers
- EC no.: 1.1.1.188
- CAS no.: 55976-95-9

Databases
- BRENDA: enzyme data
- ExPASy: NiceZyme view
- KEGG: enzyme entry
- MetaCyc: metabolic pathway
- Rhea: reactions
- PDB structures: RCSB PDB PDBe PDBsum
- Gene Ontology: AmiGO / QuickGO
Search
- PMC: articles
- PubMed: articles
- NCBI: proteins

In enzymology, prostaglandin-F synthase (PGFS; EC 1.1.1.188) is an enzyme that catalyzes the chemical reaction:

Prostaglandin D2
+ NADPH
H^{+}
H^{+}
Prostaglandin F2α
+ NADP^{+}

The three substrates of this enzyme are prostaglandin D2, reduced nicotinamide adenine dinucleotide phosphate (NADPH) and a proton. Its products are prostaglandin F2α and oxidised NADP^{+}.

PGFS is a monomeric wild-type protein that was first purified from bovine lung (PDB ID: 2F38). This enzyme belongs to the family of aldo-keto reductase (AKR) based on its high substrate specificity, its high molecular weight (38055.48 Da) and amino acid sequence. In addition, it is categorized as C3 (AKR1C3) because it is an isoform of 3α-hydroxysteroid dehydrogenase.

The function of PGFS is to catalyze the reduction of aldehydes and ketones to their corresponding alcohols. In humans, these reactions take place mostly in the lungs and in the liver. More specifically, PGFS catalyzes the reduction of PGD_{2} to 9α,11β–PGF_{2} and PGH_{2} to PGF2α by using NADPH as cofactor.

== Nomenclature ==
This enzyme belongs to the family of oxidoreductases, specifically those acting on the CH-OH group of donor with NAD^{+} or NADP^{+} as acceptor. The systematic name of this enzyme class is (5Z,13E)-(15S)-9alpha,11alpha,15-trihydroxyprosta-5,13-dienoate:NADP^{+} 11-oxidoreductase.

Other names in common use include prostaglandin-D_{2} 11-reductase, reductase, 15-hydroxy-11-oxoprostaglandin, PGD_{2} 11-ketoreductase, PGF_{2α} synthetase, prostaglandin 11-ketoreductase, prostaglandin D_{2}-ketoreductase, prostaglandin F synthase, prostaglandin F synthetase, synthetase, prostaglandin F_{2α}, prostaglandin-D_{2} 11-reductase, PGF synthetase, NADPH-dependent prostaglandin D_{2} 11-keto reductase, and prostaglandin 11-keto reductase. This enzyme participates in arachidonic acid metabolism.

== Structure ==
As of late 2007, 7 structures have been solved for this class of enzymes, with PDB accession codes PDB: 1RY0, PDB: 1RY8, PDB: 1VBJ, PDB: 1XF0, PDB: 1ZQ5, PDB: 2F38, and PDB: 2FGB.

The primary structure of prostaglandin F synthase consists of 323 amino acid residues. The secondary structure consists of 17 α-helices which contain 130 residues and 18 β-strands which contain 55 residues as well as many random coils. The tertiary structure is a single subunit.

The active site of the enzyme is referred to as an (α/β)_{8} barrel because it consists of 8 α-helices and 8 β-strands. More specifically, the eight α-helices surround the eight β-strands which form the cylindrical core of the active site. In addition, the active site of the enzyme contains also three random coils which help to connect the helices and strands together. The size of the active site of the enzyme is large enough not only to bind NADPH cofactor but also to bind the substrates PGD_{2} or PGH_{2}.

== Reaction ==
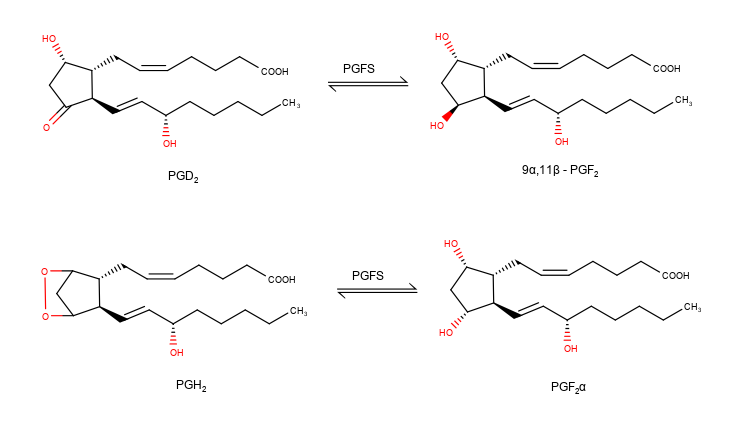
Reduction of PGD_{2} and PGH_{2.}

In order for the PGFS enzyme to catalyze the reduction of the substrates PGH_{2} or PGD_{2}, the cofactor NADPH must be present in the active site. This cofactor is present deep within the cavity of the enzyme and forms a hydrogen bond with it, whereas the substrate is located closer to the mouth of the cavity which limits its interaction with PGFS. The rate determining step of the catalysis is the binding of NADPH cofactor in the active site of the enzyme. This is because the binding of NADPH occurs before the binding of the substrate. NADPH is an important cofactor because it is involved in the hydride transfer which is necessary for the reduction to take place.

More specifically, in order for the hydride transfer to occur, the substrate (PGD_{2}) has to bind to the active site of the enzyme PGFS. The substrate binds to the active site through hydrogen bonding between the carbonyl group of PGD_{2} and the hydroxyl group of tyrosine (Y55) as well as one of the imidazole nitrogen of histidine (H117). The hydride shift from NADPH reduces the carbonyl group of PGD_{2} and forms a new sp^{3} hydroxyl group (9α,11β–PGF_{2}).

The protonation of the carbonyl oxygen is facilitated at low pH when histidine is used and at high pH when tyrosine is used for hydrogen bonding with the substrate. On the one hand, histidine is an ideal proton donor at low pH because of its pKa value (6.00), which means that it is protonated at a pH below 6.00. On the other hand, tyrosine is an ideal proton donor at higher pH because of its pKa value (10.1). The type of amino acid that is used for protonation depends on the substrate. For example, reduction of PGD_{2} in the human body occurs at a pH range of 6-9, which makes histidine an ideal proton donor.

The hydride that is transferred to the carbonyl oxygen of PGD_{2} causes weakening of the hydrogen bond between the substrate and the enzyme. This has as a result the cleavage of the product (9α,11β–PGF2) from the active site of the enzyme.

== Use ==
In general, prostaglandins are molecules that are used for inflammation, muscle contraction and blood clotting. Prostaglandin F synthase (PGFS) is very important enzyme because it catalyzes the formation of 9α,11β–PGF_{2} and PGF2α which are critical for the contraction of bronchial, vascular and arterial smooth muscle.

Also, this enzyme can be used in cancer research. Recent studies have shown that there is a correlation between high levels of PGFS in gastrointestinal tumors and the effectiveness of non-steroidal anti-inflammatory drugs (NSAID). The inhibition of PGFS by NSAID could turn out to be a very important medicinal field in the development of anti-cancer medication.

== Inhibition ==
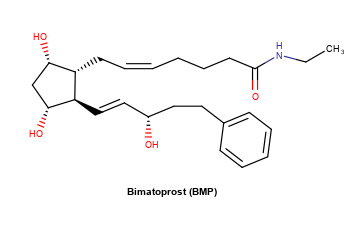
Chemical structure of bimatoprost

Prostaglandin F synthase can be inhibited not only by NSAIDs such as indometacin and suprofen but also by a molecule known as bimatoprost (BMP). BMP, an analogue of PGD_{2} is an ocular hypotensive agent that binds to the active site of the PGFS enzyme. This means that it inhibits the action of PGFS to catalyze the conversion of PGD_{2} to 9α,11β–PGF_{2} and PGH_{2} to PGF2α because it inhibits the substrate to bind to the active site of the enzyme.
