= C20H34O5 =

The molecular formula C_{20}H_{34}O_{5} (molar mass: 354.48 g/mol, exact mass: 354.2406 u) may refer to:

- Prostaglandin F2alpha
- Prostaglandin E1 (PGE1), or alprostadil
