= Bimatoprost =

Chemical compound

Clinical data
- Trade names: Lumigan, others
- AHFS/Drugs.com: Monograph
- MedlinePlus: a602030
- License data: US DailyMed: Bimatoprost
- Pregnancy category: AU: B3
- Routes of administration: eye drops
- ATC code: S01EE03 (WHO)

Legal status
- Legal status: AU: S4 (Prescription only); US: ℞-only; EU: Rx-only

Pharmacokinetic data
- Bioavailability: Low
- Protein binding: 88%
- Onset of action: 4 hrs
- Elimination half-life: 45 min after intravenous application
- Duration of action: ≥ 24 hrs
- Excretion: 67% Kidney, 25% fecal

Identifiers
- IUPAC name: 7-[3,5-dihydroxy-2- (3-hydroxy-5-phenyl-pent-1-enyl)- cyclopentyl]-N-ethyl-hept-5-enamide
- CAS Number: 155206-00-1
- PubChem CID: 5311027
- IUPHAR/BPS: 1958
- DrugBank: DB00905
- ChemSpider: 4470565
- UNII: QXS94885MZ
- KEGG: D02724
- ChEBI: CHEBI:51230
- ChEMBL: ChEMBL1200963
- CompTox Dashboard (EPA): DTXSID30895042
- ECHA InfoCard: 100.170.712

Chemical and physical data
- Formula: C_{25}H_{37}NO_{4}
- Molar mass: 415.574 g·mol^{−1}
- 3D model (JSmol): Interactive image
- SMILES: CCNC(=O)CCC/C=C\C[C@H]1[C@@H](O)C[C@@H](O)[C@@H]1/C=C/[C@@H](O)CCc1ccccc1
- InChI: InChI=1S/C25H37NO4/c1-2-26-25(30)13-9-4-3-8-12-21-22(24(29)18-23(21)28)17-16-20(27)15-14-19-10-6-5-7-11-19/h3,5-8,10-11,16-17,20-24,27-29H,2,4,9,12-15,18H2,1H3,(H,26,30)/b8-3-,17-16+/t20-,21+,22+,23-,24+/m0/s1; Key:AQOKCDNYWBIDND-FTOWTWDKSA-N

Bimatoprost, sold under the brand name Lumigan among others, is a medication used to treat high pressure inside the eye including glaucoma. Specifically it is used for open angle glaucoma when other agents are not sufficient. It may also be used to increase the size of the eyelashes. It is used as an eye drop and effects generally occur within four hours.

Common side effects include red eyes, dry eyes, change in color of the eyes, blurry vision, and cataracts. Use during pregnancy or breastfeeding is generally not recommended. It is a prostaglandin analog and works by increasing the outflow of aqueous fluid from the eyes.

Bimatoprost was approved for medical use in the United States in 2001. It is available as a generic medication. In 2023, it was the 238th most commonly prescribed medication in the United States, with more than 1 million prescriptions.

== Uses ==
=== Medical ===
Bimatoprost is used for the treatment of open-angle glaucoma and ocular hypertension in adults, either alone or in combination with a beta blocker, typically timolol.

Studies have shown bimatoprost to be more effective than timolol in reduction of intraocular pressure (IOP) and at least as effective as the prostaglandin analogs latanoprost and travoprost in reducing IOP.

=== Cosmetic ===
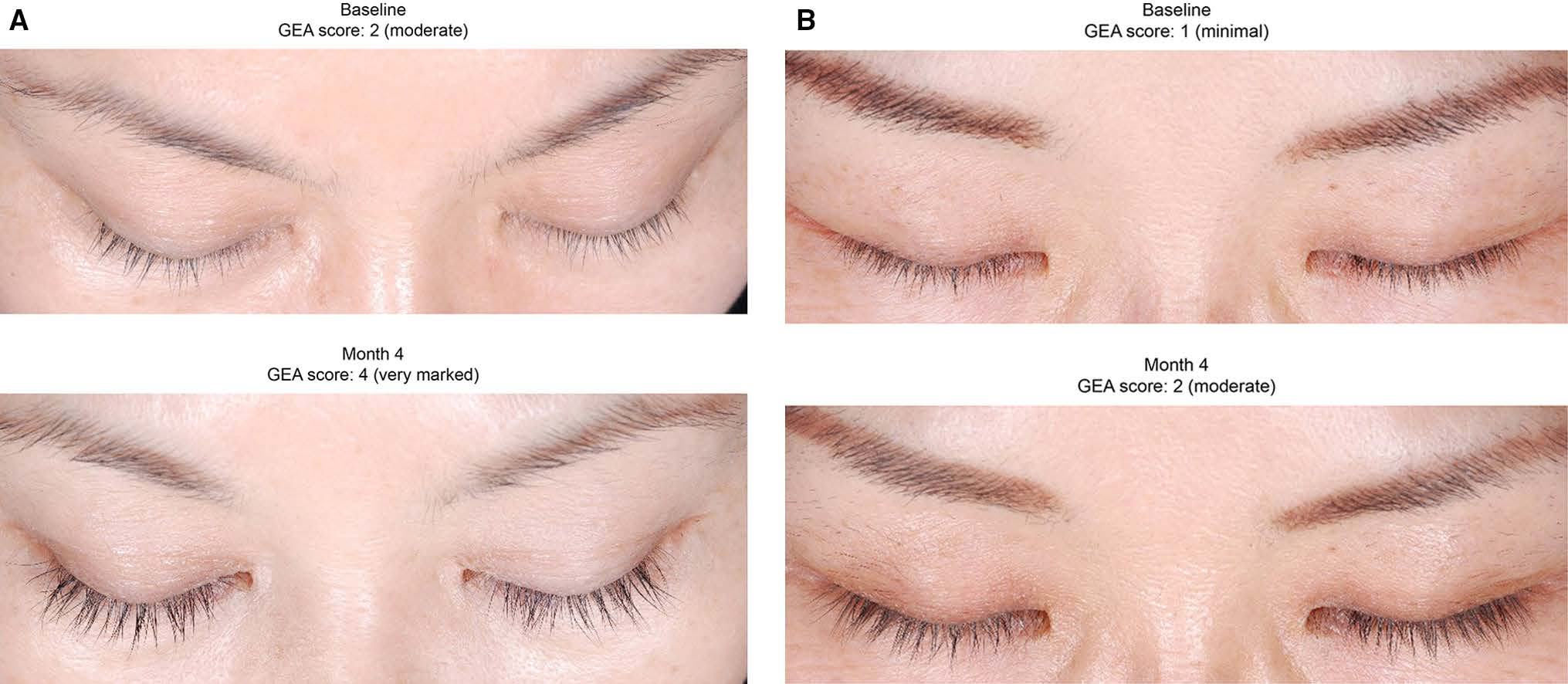
Bimatoprost is used cosmetically to increase eyelash prominence

Bimatoprost may be used to treat small or underdeveloped eyelashes. The medical term for this is treatment of hypotrichosis; however, the U.S. Food and Drug Administration (FDA) approval is for purely cosmetic purposes (see Prostaglandin F receptor#Clinical significance).

== Side effects ==
Side effects are similar to other prostaglandin analogs applied to the eye. The most common one is conjunctival hyperemia, which occurs in more than 10% of patients. Other effects include blurred vision, eye and eyelid redness, eye burning or other discomfort, and permanent darkening of the iris to brown. Occasional adverse effects (in less than 1% of patients) are headache and nausea.

Some side effects are specific to the cosmetic formulation, which is applied to the skin at the base of the eyelash rather than instilled into the eye. These include infection if the one-time applicators are reused, and darkening of the eyelid or of the area beneath the eye. Research suggests that wiping the eye with an absorbent pad after the administration of eye drops can result in shorter eyelashes and a lesser chance of hyperpigmentation in the eyelid, compared to not wiping off excess fluid.

== Interactions ==
No interaction studies with this substance have been performed. Interactions with systemic (for example, oral) drugs are considered unlikely because bimatoprost does not reach relevant concentrations in the bloodstream. Bimatoprost does not negatively interact with timolol eye drops.

== Pharmacology ==
=== Mechanism of action ===
Bimatoprost is a structural analog of prostaglandin F_{2α} (PGF_{2α}). Like other PGF_{2α} analogs such as travoprost, latanoprost and tafluprost, it increases the outflow of aqueous fluid from the eye and lowers intraocular pressure. However, in contrast to these it does not act on the prostaglandin F receptor, nor on any other known prostaglandin receptor. It is thought that bimatoprost mimics the human body's own prostamides (which are chemically similar), a class of substances related to prostaglandins, but with an unknown mechanism of action. No prostamide receptor has been identified as of 2015; the search is ongoing. As of 2019 it was thought that bimatoprost worked via the trabecular meshwork and uveoscleral pathways.

=== Pharmacokinetics ===
Bimatoprost is well absorbed through the cornea. It starts lowering intraocular pressure after four hours, lasting for at least 24 hours. A low percentage enters the bloodstream. In the blood plasma, peak concentrations are reached after 10 minutes, then drop below the detection limit of 25 pg/ml after 1.5 hours. The substance does not accumulate in the body.

Plasma protein binding is 88%. Bimatoprost is metabolized by oxidation, N-deethylation and glucuronidation, forming a variety of metabolites. Biological half-life was measured to be 45 minutes after intravenous infusion. 67% are eliminated via the kidney, and 25% via the feces.

== Research ==
Bimatoprost has been used to treat eyebrow hypotrichosis in a 60-year old female. The 0.03% solution was applied topically once a day for eight months and showed "increased hair growth and thickening of the eyebrow hairs".

Bimatoprost and its endogenous analog prostaglandin F2α ethanolamide present the side-effect of being anti-adipogenic, and have been shown to be inducers of preadipocyte proliferation. These findings suggest bimatoprost is a possible therapy for obesity.
