= László Z. Bitó =

Hungarian writer (1934–2021)

László Z. Bitó

László Z. Bitó (7 September 1934 – 14 November 2021) was a Hungarian physiologist and writer. As a researcher, he developed a medication for glaucoma. As a writer, he wrote novels and essays.

== Biography ==
László Bitó was born in Budapest, Hungary. His family was forced to leave Budapest during the Communist era. He served in a mine in Komló and became a local leader of the revolution in 1956. After the revolution was crushed by Russian forces, he fled to the United States where he won a scholarship and became a physiologist. He was granted asylum in the United States and came to Bard College in the winter field period of 1956–57. Bitó graduated from Bard College in 1960 as a pre-med biology major. He went on to obtain his PhD from Columbia University in medical cell biology in 1963. His research led to the development of latanoprost (Xalatan), the drug that has saved the sight of millions of glaucoma sufferers. He published more than 150 scientific articles and received, among many other honors, the highest recognition in the field of eye research, the Proctor Medal, in 2000 and the Helen Keller Prize for Vision Research in 2013. Upon retiring from Columbia University as Emeritus Professor of Ocular Physiology, he returned to Hungary and his first love of writing. Of his 14 nonscientific books—novels, essays, and three anthologies of some of his more than a hundred newspaper and magazine articles—some have appeared in translations in half a dozen countries.

Bitó died in Budapest on 14 November 2021.

== Scientific career ==
In the United States, László Bitó has built an academic career as an internationally known professor of physiology. Most of his academic career is connected to Columbia University (where he was Professor Emeritus of Ocular Physiology) and to the University of Puerto Rico where he studied the effect of ageing on the eyes of monkeys. The fruit of his research is latanoprost, the medicine for glaucoma. The development of latanoprost brought a fundamental change to the treatment of this blinding disease. He published more than 140 scientific papers and was awarded the Proctor Medal (2000) and Columbia University Award for Distinguished Achievement (2004).

== Writing ==
László Bitó gradually moved back to Hungary after the fall of Communism and started a new career as a writer. His first novels are based on his early personal memories of Hungarian history. Istenjárás (Quick Step) and Az Ötödik Lovas (The Fifth Horseman) were written in English but published only in Hungarian translations. His third novel, based on Biblical stories, "Abraham and Isaac" brought him literary success in 1998. The book was translated to several languages and was put on stage in Budapest theaters. "The Teachings of Isaac" and "Isaac of Nazareth" followed the philosophical ideas in "Abraham and Isaac" to a logical conclusion.

His most recent books are the work of an American citizen and a Hungarian patriot. Nekünk kell megváltanunk magunkat (We Must Be Our Own Saviors) is a selection of his newspaper and magazine articles and interviews. Eutelia – Euthanasia (Blissful Life - Peaceful Death) is a philosophical writer’s and a humanist medical researcher’s argument about dignity in life and death. Az utolsó mérföld (The Last Mile) written together with Polcz, Alaine, a Hungarian writer and founder of the Hungarian hospice service, is a book about preparing to die.

== Books ==
=== Academic publications ===
- The Ocular and Cerebrospinal Fluids, with Davson H, Fenstermacher JD (Eds.),Academic Press, London, 1977.
- The Ocular Effects of Prostaglandins and Other Eicosanoids, with Stjernschantz J (Eds), Alan R. Liss, New York, 1989.
- Ocular Effects of Prostaglandins and Other Eicosanoids (Ed), Special Supplement based on the 9th International PG Symposium (Fort Lauderdale, Florida, 12–13 May 1995) and the ARVO SIG Sessions on Latanoprost (Fort Lauderdale, Florida, 22–23 April 1996). Survey of Ophthalmology Vol. 41, Suppl 2, 1997.

=== Novels ===
- Istenjárás, (Quick Step), Aura, 1994. (Translated from English by Árpád Göncz and Pál Békés) ISBN 963-7913-15-7
- Az ötödik lovas, (The Fifth Horseman), Aura, 1996. (Translated by Pál Békés) ISBN 963-7913-17-3
- Ábrahám és Izsák,(Abraham and Isaac), Magyar Könyvklub, 1998. ISBN 963-548-698-7 és Argumentum Kiadó, 2000. ISBN 963-446-158-1
- Izsák tanítása, (The Teachings of Isaac), Argumentum Kiadó, 2000. ISBN 963-446-131-X
- A Názáreti Izsák, (Isaac of Nazareth), Argumentum Kiadó, 2002. ISBN 963-446-208-1

=== Essays and collections ===
- Nekünk kell megváltanunk magunkat, (We must be our own saviors), Argumentum Kiadó, 2004. ISBN 963-446-288-X.
- Boldogabb élet - Jó halál, (Blissful Life - Peaceful Death), Anthenaeum 2000 Kiadó, 2005. ISBN 963-9471-82-8.
- Gáspár, Menyhért, Boldizsár, Karácsonyi ős-ökuménia, (Caspar, Melchior and Balthazar), Ecumenical Chanuka and Christmas story with 30 fullpage color illustrations by Wanda Szyksznian, Jelenkor Kiadó, 2006. ISBN 963-676-409-3
- Az utolsó mérföld (The Last Mile) (with Polcz, Alaine), Jelenkor Kiadó, 2007. ISBN 978-963-676-418-0
