= Prostaglandin analogue =

Drug class

Prostaglandin analogues are a class of drugs that bind to a prostaglandin receptor.

Wider use of prostaglandin analogues is limited by unwanted side effects and their abortive potential.

== Uses ==
Prostaglandin analogues such as misoprostol are used in treatment of duodenal and gastric ulcers. Misoprostol and other prostaglandin analogues protect the lining of the gastrointestinal tract from harmful stomach acid and are especially indicated for the elderly on continuous doses of NSAIDs.

In the field of ophthalmology, drugs of this class are used to lower intraocular pressure (IOP) in people with glaucoma. Up until the late 1970s prostaglandins were thought to raise IOP, but a paper published in 1977 showed that prostaglandin F2α lowered it, and subsequent studies found that this was due to increasing the outflow of aqueous humor, mainly by relaxing the ciliary muscle, and possibly also due to changes in extracellular matrix and to widening of spaces within the trabecular meshwork. This work led to the development of prodrugs of PGF2α, including latanoprost, an isopropyl analogue of PGF2α, approved by the FDA in 1996, bimatoprost and travoprost, both approved in 2001, and tafluprost, approved in 2012. However, there are notable side effects associated with usage, including increased eyelash growth, pigmentation of the iris, and darkening of the skin around the eye.
