= Travoprost =

Chemical compound

Clinical data
- Trade names: Travatan
- AHFS/Drugs.com: Monograph
- MedlinePlus: a602027
- License data: US DailyMed: Travoprost
- Pregnancy category: AU: B3
- Routes of administration: Topical eye drops
- ATC code: S01EE04 (WHO)

Legal status
- Legal status: AU: S4 (Prescription only); UK: POM (Prescription only); US: ℞-only; EU: Rx-only; In general: ℞ (Prescription only)

Pharmacokinetic data
- Metabolism: Activation by ester hydrolysis, deactivation by beta oxidation, OH-oxidation, double bond reduction
- Onset of action: 2 hours
- Elimination half-life: 1.5 hours (in aqueous fluid); 45 minutes (terminal)
- Duration of action: ≥ 24 hours
- Excretion: Mainly via kidney

Identifiers
- IUPAC name: Propan-2-yl 7-[3,5-dihydroxy-2-[3-hydroxy-4-[3-(trifluoromethyl) phenoxy]-but-1-enyl]-cyclopentyl]hept-5-enoate
- CAS Number: 157283-68-6
- PubChem CID: 5282226
- IUPHAR/BPS: 7102
- DrugBank: DB00287
- ChemSpider: 4445407
- UNII: WJ68R08KX9
- KEGG: D01964
- ChEBI: CHEBI:746859
- ChEMBL: ChEMBL1200799
- CompTox Dashboard (EPA): DTXSID80896948
- ECHA InfoCard: 100.207.141

Chemical and physical data
- Formula: C_{26}H_{35}F_{3}O_{6}
- Molar mass: 500.555 g·mol^{−1}
- 3D model (JSmol): Interactive image
- SMILES: FC(F)(F)c2cc(OC[C@H](O)/C=C/[C@@H]1[C@H]([C@@H](O)C[C@H]1O)C\C=C/CCCC(=O)OC(C)C)ccc2
- InChI: InChI=1S/C26H35F3O6/c1-17(2)35-25(33)11-6-4-3-5-10-21-22(24(32)15-23(21)31)13-12-19(30)16-34-20-9-7-8-18(14-20)26(27,28)29/h3,5,7-9,12-14,17,19,21-24,30-32H,4,6,10-11,15-16H2,1-2H3/b5-3-,13-12+/t19-,21-,22-,23+,24-/m1/s1; Key:MKPLKVHSHYCHOC-AHTXBMBWSA-N

Travoprost, sold under the brand name Travatan among others, is a medication used to treat high pressure inside the eye including glaucoma. Specifically it is used for open angle glaucoma when other agents are not sufficient. It is used as an eye drop. Effects generally occur within two hours.

Common side effects include red eyes, blurry vision, eye pain, dry eyes, and change in color of the eyes. Other significant side effects may include cataracts. Use during pregnancy or breastfeeding is generally not recommended. It is a prostaglandin analog and works by increasing the outflow of aqueous fluid from the eyes.

Travoprost was approved for medical use in the United States and in the European Union in 2001. It is available as a generic medication in the United Kingdom. In 2020, it was the 304th most commonly prescribed medication in the United States, with more than 1 million prescriptions.

== Medical uses ==
Travoprost is used to treat high pressure inside the eye including glaucoma. Specifically it is used for open angle glaucoma when other agents are not sufficient.

== Side effects ==
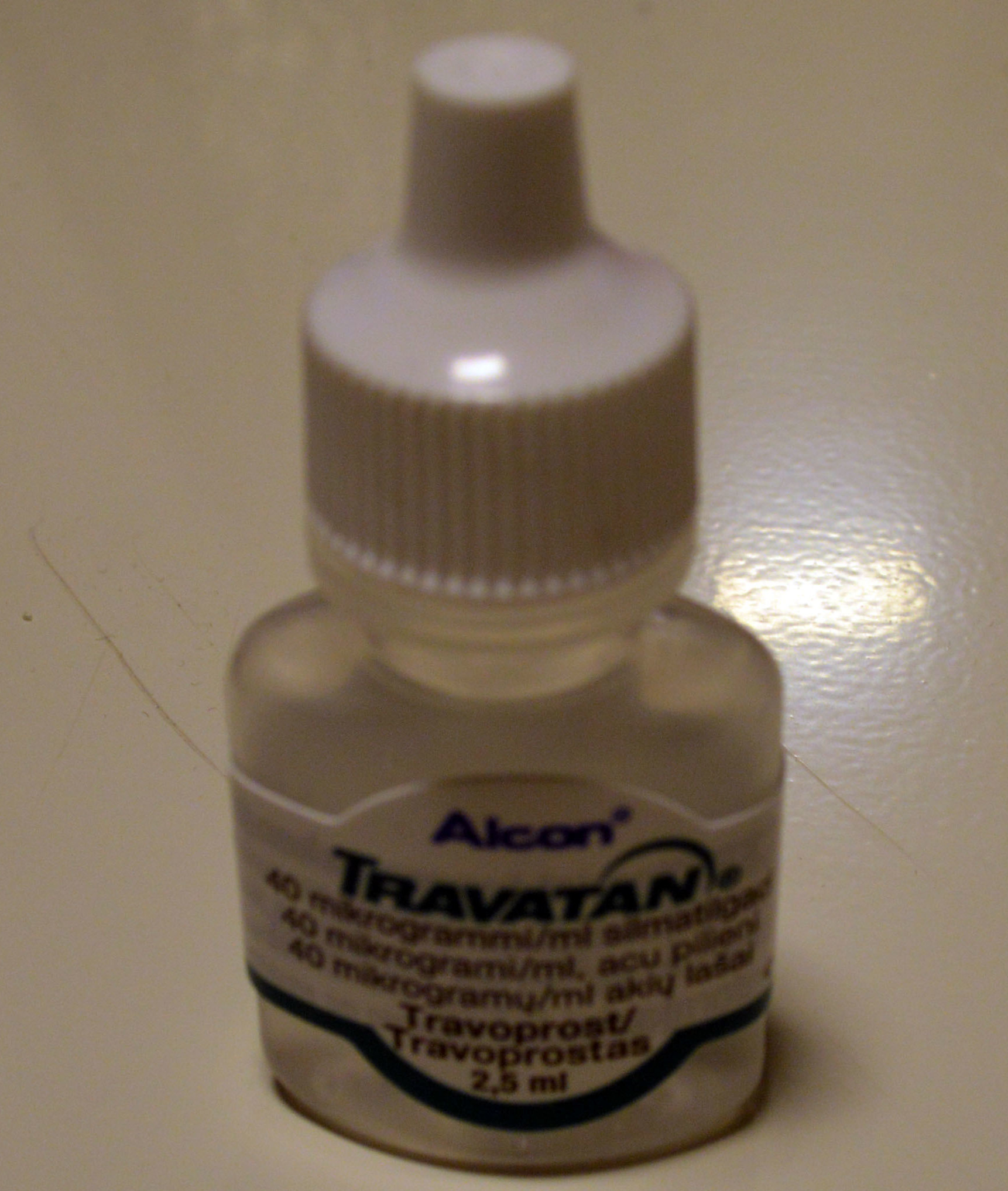
One 2.5 ml dropperette of Travatan

Possible side effects are:

- blurred vision
- eyelid redness
- permanent darkening of eyelashes
- eye discomfort
- permanent darkening of the iris to brown (heterochromia)
- burning sensation during use
- thickening of the eyelashes
- inflammation of the prostate gland, restricting urine flow (BPH)

Research suggests that wiping the eye with an absorbent pad after the administration of eye drops can result in shorter eyelashes and a lesser chance of hyperpigmentation in the eyelid, compared to not wiping off excess fluid.

== Pharmacology ==
=== Mechanism of action ===
It is a synthetic prostaglandin analog (or more specifically, an analog of prostaglandin F_{2α}) that works by increasing the outflow of aqueous fluid from the eyes.

Like other analogs of prostaglandin F_{2α} such as tafluprost and latanoprost, travoprost is an ester prodrug of the free acid, which acts as an agonist at the prostaglandin F receptor, increasing outflow of aqueous fluid from the eye and thus lowering intraocular pressure.

=== Pharmacokinetics ===
Travoprost is absorbed through the cornea, where it is hydrolysed to the free travoprost acid. Highest concentrations of the acid in the eye are reached one to two hours after application, and its half-life in the aqueous fluid is 1.5 hours. Once it reaches the bloodstream, it is quickly metabolised, so that concentrations in the system do not exceed 25 pg/ml (compared to 20 ng/ml in the eye, which is higher by nearly a factor of 1000).Metabolites are formed by beta oxidation of the acidic chain (compare Tafluprost#Pharmacokinetics), oxidation of the OH-group in the other side chain, and reduction of the double bond next to this OH-group. Travoprost acid and its metabolites are mainly excreted via the kidney with a terminal half-life of 45 minutes.

Metabolism. From left to right: travoprost, travoprost acid (the active metabolite), 1,2-dinortravoprost acid, 1,2,3,4-tetranortravoprost acid. Below: reduction of the 13,14-double bond (red) and oxidation of the 15-hydroxy group (blue)
