= Timolol =

Chemical compound

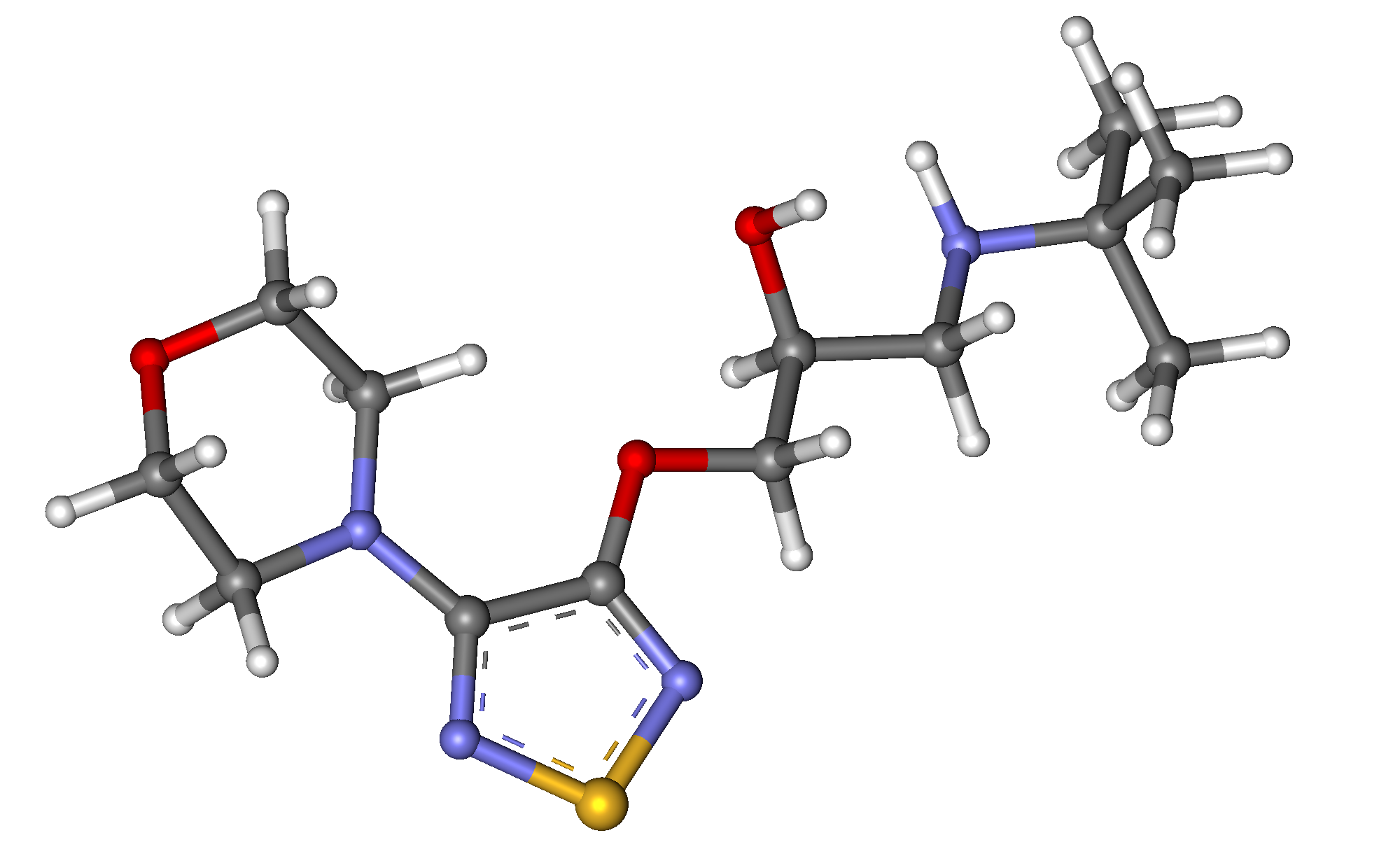

Clinical data
- Trade names: Timoptic, others
- AHFS/Drugs.com: Maleate Monograph eent Monograph
- MedlinePlus: a684029
- License data: US DailyMed: Timolol
- Pregnancy category: AU: C
- Routes of administration: By mouth, topical (eye drop)
- Drug class: Beta blocker
- ATC code: C07AA06 (WHO) S01ED01 (WHO) C07BA06 (WHO) C07DA06 (WHO) Combination: S01ED51 (WHO)

Legal status
- Legal status: CA: ℞-only; UK: POM (Prescription only); US: ℞-only

Pharmacokinetic data
- Bioavailability: 60%
- Metabolism: Liver (80%, mainly CYP2D6)
- Onset of action: 15–30 min
- Elimination half-life: 2.5–5 hours
- Duration of action: 24 hours
- Excretion: Kidney

Identifiers
- IUPAC name: (S)-1-(tert-Butylamino)-3-[(4-morpholin-4-yl-1,2,5-thiadiazol-3-yl)oxy]propan-2-ol
- CAS Number: 26839-75-8
- PubChem CID: 33624
- IUPHAR/BPS: 565
- DrugBank: DB00373
- ChemSpider: 31013
- UNII: 5JKY92S7BR
- KEGG: D08600; as salt: D00603
- ChEBI: CHEBI:9599
- ChEMBL: ChEMBL499
- CompTox Dashboard (EPA): DTXSID4023674
- ECHA InfoCard: 100.043.651

Chemical and physical data
- Formula: C_{13}H_{24}N_{4}O_{3}S
- Molar mass: 316.42 g·mol^{−1}
- 3D model (JSmol): Interactive image
- SMILES: CC(C)(C)NCC(O)COc1nsnc1N1CCOCC1
- InChI: InChI=1S/C13H24N4O3S/c1-13(2,3)14-8-10(18)9-20-12-11(15-21-16-12)17-4-6-19-7-5-17/h10,14,18H,4-9H2,1-3H3/t10-/m0/s1; Key:BLJRIMJGRPQVNF-JTQLQIEISA-N

Timolol is a beta blocker medication used either by mouth or as eye drops. As eye drops it is used to treat increased pressure inside the eye such as in ocular hypertension and glaucoma. By mouth it is used for high blood pressure, chest pain due to insufficient blood flow to the heart, to prevent further complications after a heart attack, and to prevent migraines.

Common side effects with the drops is irritation of the eye. Common side effects by mouth include tiredness, slow heart beat, itchiness, and shortness of breath. Other side effects include masking the symptoms of low blood sugar in those with diabetes. Use is not recommended in those with asthma, uncompensated heart failure, or chronic obstructive pulmonary disease (COPD). It is unclear if use during pregnancy is safe for the fetus. Timolol is a non-selective beta blocker.

Timolol was patented in 1968, and came into medical use in 1978. It is on the World Health Organization's List of Essential Medicines. Timolol is available as a generic medication. In 2023, it was the 173rd most commonly prescribed medication in the United States, with more than 2 million prescriptions.

== Medical uses ==
=== By mouth ===
In its by mouth or oral form, it is used:

- to treat high blood pressure
- to prevent heart attacks
- to prevent migraine headaches

The combination of timolol and the alpha-1 blocker prazosin has sedative effects.

=== Eye drops ===
In its eye drop form it is used to treat open-angle and, occasionally, secondary glaucoma. The mechanism of action of timolol is probably the reduction of the formation of aqueous humor in the ciliary body in the eye. It was the first beta blocker approved for topical use in treatment of glaucoma in the United States (1978). When used by itself, it depresses intraocular pressure (IOP) 18–34% below baseline within first few treatments. However, there are short-term escape and long-term drift effects in some people. That is, tolerance develops. It may reduce the extent of the daytime IOP curve up to 50%. The IOP is higher during sleep. Efficacy of timolol in lowering IOP during the sleep period may be limited. It is a 5–10× more potent beta blocker than propranolol. Timolol is light-sensitive; it is usually preserved with 0.01% benzalkonium chloride (BAC), but also comes BAC-free. It can also be used in combination with pilocarpine, carbonic anhydrase inhibitors or prostaglandin analogs.

A Cochrane review compared the effect of timolol versus brimonidine in slowing the progression of open angle glaucoma in adults but found insufficient evidence to come to conclusions.

=== On the skin ===
In its gel form it is used on the skin to treat infantile hemangiomas.

=== Available forms ===
It is available in tablet and liquid formulations.

For ophthalmic use, timolol is also available combined:

- with carbonic anhydrase inhibitors:
  - timolol and brinzolamide
  - timolol and dorzolamide
- with α_{2} agonists:
  - timolol and brimonidine
- with prostaglandin analogs:
  - timolol and latanoprost
  - timolol and travoprost

== Contraindications ==
The medication should not be taken by individuals with:

- An allergy to timolol or any other beta-blockers
- Asthma or severe chronic obstructive bronchitis
- A slow heart rate (bradycardia), or a heart block
- Heart failure

== Side effects ==
The most serious possible side effects include cardiac arrhythmias and severe bronchospasms. Timolol can also lead to fainting, congestive heart failure, depression, confusion, worsening of Raynaud's syndrome and impotence.

Side effects when given in the eye include: burning sensation, eye redness, superficial punctate keratopathy, corneal numbness.

== Chemistry ==
The experimental log P of timolol is 1.8 and its predicted log P ranges from 0.68 to 1.8.

== Society and culture ==
=== Brand names ===
Timolol is sold under many brand names worldwide. Timolol eye drops are sold under the brand names Timoptic and Istalol among others.
