= Prostaglandin F2alpha =

Chemical compound

Dinoprost

Clinical data
- Other names: Amoglandin, Croniben, Cyclosin, Dinifertin, Enzaprost, Glandin, PGF2α, Panacelan, Prostamodin
- AHFS/Drugs.com: International Drug Names
- Routes of administration: Intravenous (cannot used to induce labor)because it cannot be used in cervix, intra-amniotic (to induce abortion)
- ATC code: G02AD01 (WHO)

Pharmacokinetic data
- Elimination half-life: 3 to 6 hours in amniotic fluid, less than 1 minute in blood plasma

Identifiers
- IUPAC name: (Z)-7-[(1R,2R,3R,5S)-3,5-dihydroxy-2-[(E,3S)- 3-hydroxyoct-1-enyl]cyclopentyl]hept-5-enoic acid
- CAS Number: 551-11-1 38562-01-5
- PubChem CID: 5280363
- IUPHAR/BPS: 1884
- DrugBank: DB01160
- ChemSpider: 4444062
- UNII: B7IN85G1HY
- KEGG: D00081
- ChEMBL: ChEMBL815
- CompTox Dashboard (EPA): DTXSID9022946
- ECHA InfoCard: 100.209.720

Chemical and physical data
- Formula: C_{20}H_{34}O_{5}
- Molar mass: 354.487 g·mol^{−1}
- 3D model (JSmol): Interactive image
- Solubility in water: 200 mg/mL (20 °C)
- SMILES: O=C(O)CCC/C=C\C[C@H]1[C@@H](O)C[C@@H](O)[C@@H]1/C=C/[C@@H](O)CCCCC
- InChI: InChI=1S/C20H34O5/c1-2-3-6-9-15(21)12-13-17-16(18(22)14-19(17)23)10-7-4-5-8-11-20(24)25/h4,7,12-13,15-19,21-23H,2-3,5-6,8-11,14H2,1H3,(H,24,25)/b7-4-,13-12+/t15-,16+,17+,18-,19+/m0/s1; Key:PXGPLTODNUVGFL-YNNPMVKQSA-N

Prostaglandin F_{2α} (PGF_{2α} in prostanoid nomenclature), pharmaceutically termed carboprost , is a naturally occurring prostaglandin used in medicine to induce labor and as an abortifacient. Prostaglandins are lipids throughout the entire body that have a hormone-like function. In pregnancy, PGF_{2α} is medically used to sustain contracture and provoke myometrial ischemia to accelerate labor and prevent significant blood loss in labor. Additionally, PGF_{2α} has been linked to being naturally involved in the process of labor. It has been seen that there are higher levels of PGF_{2α} in maternal fluid during labor when compared to at term. This signifies that there is likely a biological use and significance to the production and secretion of PGF_{2α} in labor. Prostaglandin is also used to treat uterine infections in domestic animals.

In domestic mammals, it is produced by the uterus when stimulated by oxytocin, in the event that there has been no implantation during the luteal phase. It acts on the corpus luteum to cause luteolysis, forming a corpus albicans and stopping the production of progesterone. Action of PGF_{2α} is dependent on the number of receptors on the corpus luteum membrane.

The PGF_{2α} isoform 8-iso-PGF_{2α} was found in significantly increased amounts in patients with endometriosis, thus being a potential causative link in endometriosis-associated oxidative stress.

== Mechanism of action ==
PGF_{2α} acts by binding to the prostaglandin F2α receptor. It is released in response to an increase in oxytocin levels in the uterus, and stimulates both luteolytic activity and the release of oxytocin. Because PGF_{2α} is linked with an increase in uterine oxytocin levels, there is evidence that PGF_{2α} and oxytocin form a positive feedback loop to facilitate the degradation of the corpus luteum. PGF_{2α} and oxytocin also inhibit the production of progesterone, a hormone that facilitates corpus luteum development. Conversely, higher progesterone levels inhibit production of PGF_{2α} and oxytocin, as the effects of the hormones are in opposition to each other. This is directly exhibited following ovulation when there is a spike of progesterone levels, and then as progesterone levels decrease, PGF_{2α} levels will peak.

== Pharmaceutical Use ==
When injected into the body or amniotic sac, PGF_{2α} can either induce labor or cause an abortion depending on the concentration used. In small doses (1–4 mg/day), PGF_{2α} acts to stimulate uterine muscle contractions, which aids in the birth process. However, during the first trimester and in higher concentrations (40 mg/day), PGF_{2α} can cause an abortion by degrading the corpus luteum, which normally acts to maintain pregnancy via the production of progesterone. Since the fetus is not viable outside the womb by this time, the lack of progesterone leads to the shedding of the uterine lining and the death of the fetus. However, this process is not fully understood.

== Pyometra and uterine infections ==
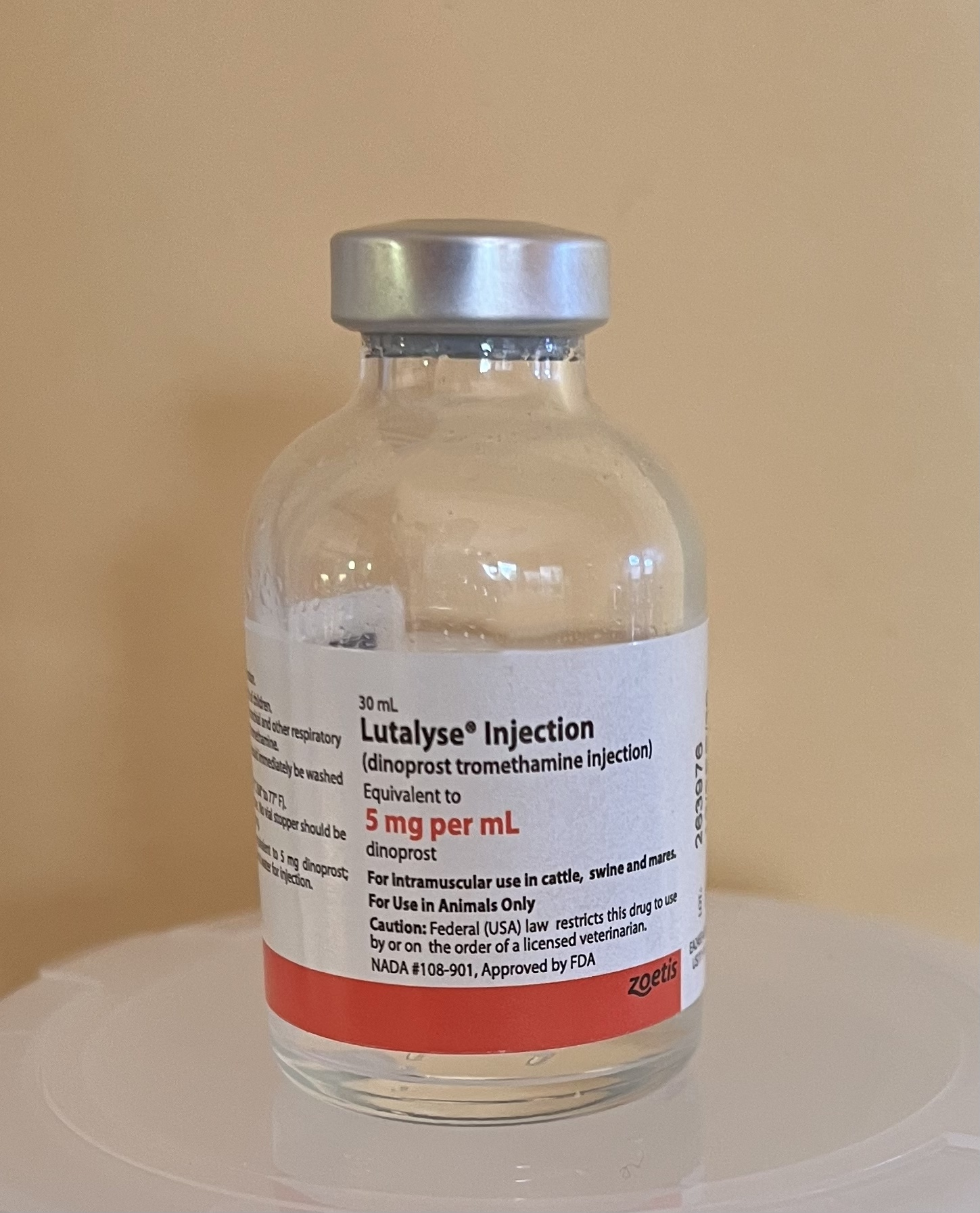
Bottle of Lutalyse® injectable

Lutalyse is used for the treatment of pyometra in domestic dogs and cats. The drug is also administered to dairy cows in order to reduce uterine infections.

== Synthesis ==
=== Industrial Synthesis ===
In 2012 a concise and highly stereoselective total synthesis of PGF_{2α} was described. The synthesis requires only seven steps, a huge improvement on the original 17-step synthesis of Corey, and uses 2,5-dimethoxytetrahydrofuran as a starting reagent, with S-proline as an asymmetric catalyst.

In 2019, a more effective and stereoselective synthesis was described. The synthesis requires 5 steps to get to the intermediate which then undergoes a cross-metathesis reaction to install the E-alkene. Then, a Wittig reaction is performed to install the Z-alkene. Finally, the protecting groups are removed with acid.

=== Biosynthesis ===
In the body PGF_{2α} is synthesized in several distinct steps. First, phospholipase A_{2} (PLA_{2}) facilitates the conversion of phospholipids to arachidonic acid, the framework from which all prostaglandins are formed. Arachidonic acid then reacts with two cyclooxygenase (COX) receptors, COX-1 and COX-2, or PGH synthase to form prostaglandin H_{2}, an intermediate. Lastly, the compound reacts with aldose reductase or prostaglandin F synthase to form PGF_{2α}. The synthase enzyme uses thioredoxin as its reducing agent.

thioredoxin +
prostaglandin H2
thioredoxin
disulfide
+
prostaglandin F2alpha

== Analogues ==
The following medications are analogues of prostaglandin F_{2α}:

- Latanoprost
- Bimatoprost
- Travoprost
- Carboprost
