= Ophthalmic drug administration =

Administration of a drug through the eyes

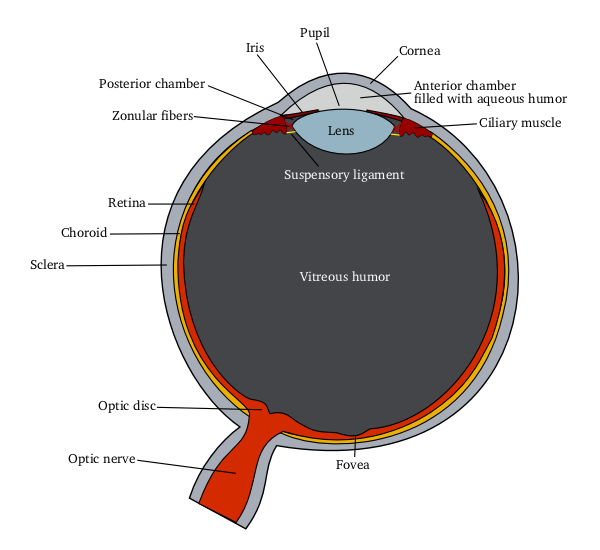
Figure 1.0 - Basic anatomical features of the human eye

Ophthalmic drug administration is the administration of a drug to the eyes, most typically as an eye drop formulation. Topical formulations are used to combat a multitude of diseased states of the eye. These states may include bacterial infections, eye injury, glaucoma, and dry eye. However, there are many challenges associated with topical delivery of drugs to the cornea of the eye.

== Eye drop formulations ==
Two of the largest challenges faced when using topicals to treat pathological states of the eye include patient compliance and ineffective absorbance of drugs into the cornea due to short contact times, solution drainage, tears turnover, and dilution or lacrimation. In fact, researchers in this field of drug delivery agree that less than 7% of drugs delivered to the eye reach and penetrate the corneal barrier, therefore, increasing the frequency of dosing used for topicals. This is one of the fundamental problem associated with using topicals to deliver drugs to the cornea and therefore leads to the increased demand for patient compliance. Together, these two factors drive a need in the field of scientific research and engineering for a way to better deliver drugs to the cornea of the eye while decreasing dosing frequency and demand for patient compliance. Strategies to achieve a prolonged residence time of drug delivery systems on ocular surface include mucoadhesive and in situ gelling polymers and thiolated cyclodextrins (see thiomers). Besides the logistical problems associated with using topicals, there are also systemic side effects which result from the administration of some drugs used to combat the pathological states of the eye. With the increased concentration of drugs in topicals and the frequent application to the eye, a majority of the drug is drained from the eye via nasolacrimal drainage. This drainage is thought to be the reason that systemic side effects exist from such administration.

== Contact lenses as delivery devices ==
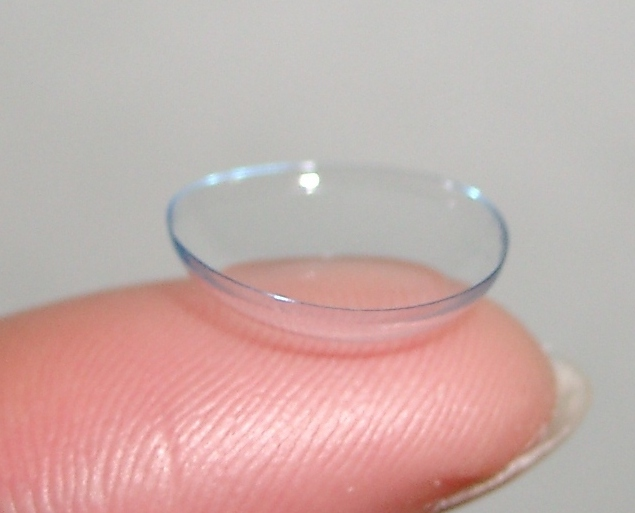
Figure 2.0 - Contact lens

The U.S. Centers for Disease Control and Prevention (CDC) claims that there were "about 41 million contact lens wearers greater than 18 years old in the United States" in 2018. Of all of these wearers, nearly 90% of them wear contact lenses known as 'soft contact lenses' (SCLs). Contact lenses are regulated by the United States Food and Drug Administration (FDA).

The main approaches that researchers in this field are using today are: molecular imprinting, supercritical soaking, solvent impregnation, and nanoparticle loading. Each of these techniques assists by hoping to deliver drugs at a lower, more sustained, rate that does not require a demand for increased patient compliance nor the systemic side effects from topical drug delivery systems. However, each of these different types of loading techniques results in contact lenses that all have separate physical and chemical challenges when it comes to the sustained release and penetration of specific drugs at the molecular level in regards to the cornea of the eye.

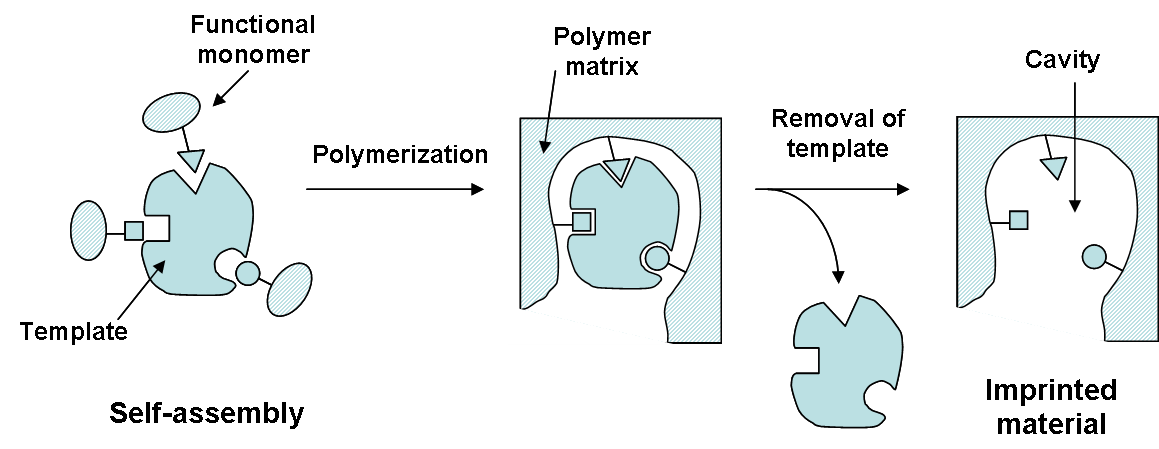
Figure 3.0 - Molecular imprinting technique

=== Molecular imprinting ===
Molecular imprinting is a process by which polymerization of a polymer around template result in the polymer matrix with embedded templates. After the template is removed, a cavity results with the functionalized monomers within the polymer cavity. This cavity is the idealized position for drug loading since this process can be designed specifically to recruit and hold onto drugs due to chemical specificity. This technique can be better visualized by referring to Figure 3.0. This type of drug loading can be used as a way to create a pH responsive system, which releases drug(s) as the pH of the biological system changes. Some drugs that have been successfully loaded via this method are: timolol, norfloxacin, ketotifen, polyvinlypyrrolidone, and hyaluronic acid. The molecular structures of each of these drugs are shown below in the index of important scientific terminology.

=== Supercritical soaking/solvent impregnation ===
The supercritical soaking method is commonly used in hydrogel-based contact lenses and is the most common of all types of molecular drug loading techniques. Since this technique requires no special equipment or advanced knowledge of polymer-based hydrogels it is the least complex of all loading types. In order to load the hydrogel matrix with a certain drug, contact lenses are simply placed in a solution of the drug and the drug diffuses into the matrix. Since this loading technique is driven solely by the gradient of the drug concentration surrounding the lens relative to the hydrogel matrix, the diffusion rate and amount of drug that is loaded can be controlled solely by the concentration of the drug solution. Since this process allows for specific amounts of a certain drug to be loaded to the hydrogel matrix, this method of loading has become important for patient-specific (personalized) medicine and treatments.

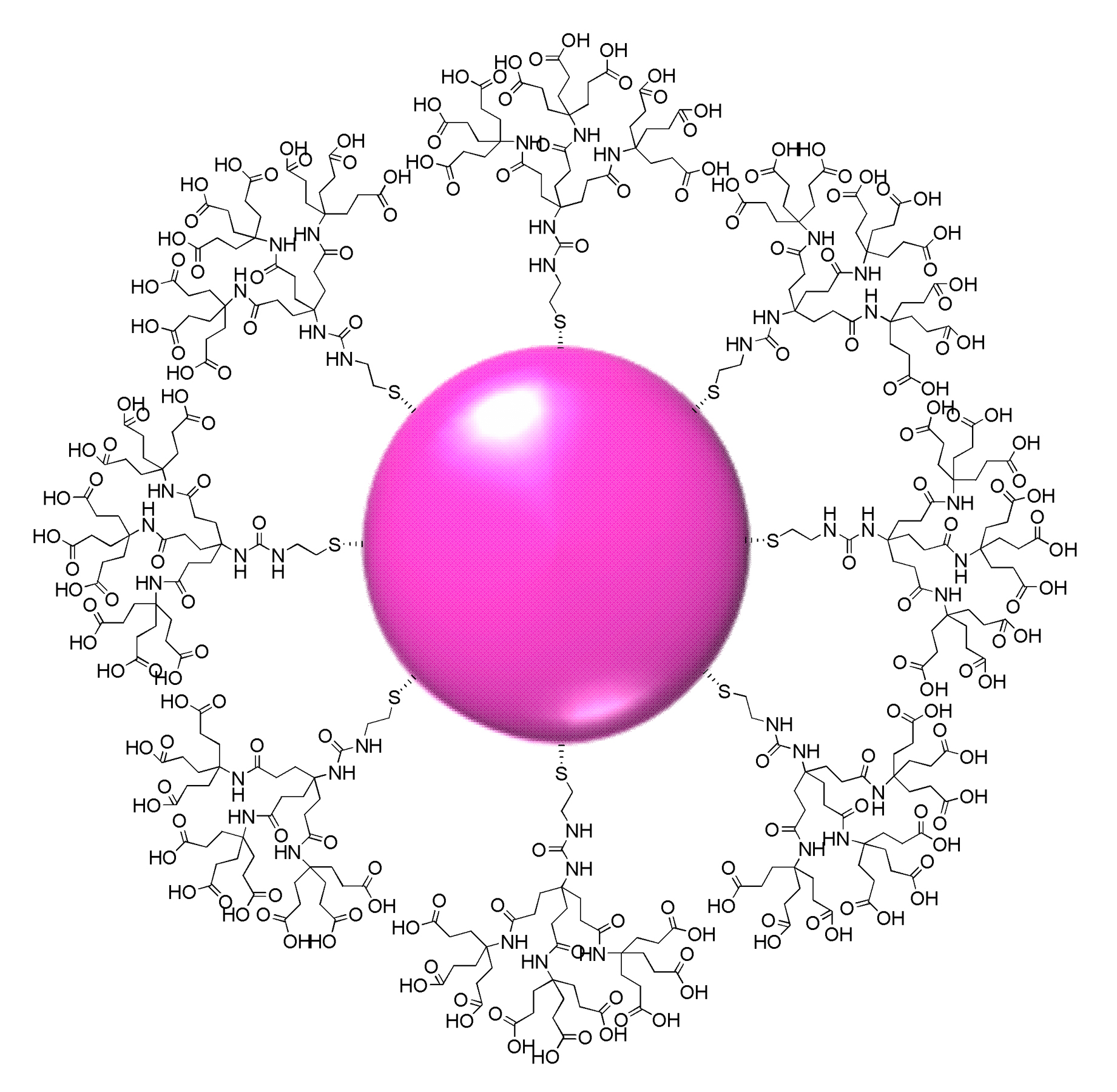
Figure 4.0 - Example of a nanoparticle

=== Nanoparticle loading ===
The nanoparticle loading technique includes two major parts. The first part of this process is the creation and conjugation of a specific drug into or onto a nanoparticle or other colloidal particle. Next, the nanoparticle is loaded into the hydrogel matrix of the contact lens. In this case, before the drug can diffuse out of the hydrogel matrix to reach the cornea, it must also diffuse or be released out of the nanoparticle.

== Physical and chemical challenges of loading ==
It is important to recognize the positives and negatives associated with each type of drug loading for using contact lenses as drug delivery devices. In order to seriously address the possibility of clinical translation of these devices, it is important to recognize the physical and chemical barriers. By understanding this better, the mechanism of drug loading and the controlled and sustained release of drugs to a patient's eye can be optimized.

=== Lens transparency ===
Since contact lenses are used on a part of the body that is important for normal daily functioning (sight) it is critical that scientists take into account the transparency of the lens. As larger and more drugs/objects are loaded to a contact lens it begins to physically crowd the space available, making it more difficult for light to penetrate and reach the eye.

Fundamental Concept Understanding: A simple analogy to this is a crowded versus an uncrowded area while it is raining outside. When individuals are packed tightly the rain falls and lands on people, making its way to the ground slowly but surely in a scattered way. In an uncrowded area, the rain can fall and land on the ground easily and without interference from the people. In this analogy, the rain is analogous to light and the people are analogous to drugs being loaded in a contact lens. The more drugs added to the contact lens, the less light that can penetrate without being randomly scattered. Random scattering of the light can result in unclear and unfocused sight. 

Researchers have noted that by using the nanoparticle loading technique, the transparency decreases by nearly 10%. Conversely, researchers have confirmed that by using the molecular imprinting and supercritical soaking methods of drug loading, the lens transparency of the contact lenses has stayed at or above the lens transparency of the contact lenses currently approved by the FDA.

=== Oxygen permeability ===
Oxygen permeability is another important feature of all contact lenses and much be optimized to the largest degree possible when creating drug delivery devices for the eye. The contact lens adheres to the external cornea of the eye which is made up of a layer of cells. Cells, being the basic component of living organisms, require sustained and constant access to oxygen in order to survive. The cornea of the eye is not supplied with blood as are most other cells in the body, making this a challenging part of the body to which to deliver drugs. Decreasing oxygenation to the eye can result in undesirable side effects. Researchers in this field have noted that different types of contact lenses have varying degrees of oxygen permeability. For example, it has been shown that SCLs have limited oxygen permeability while silicon-based contact lenses have much better oxygen permeability. Silicon-base contact lenses have also been shown to have some other very important physical parameters.

Researchers have attempted to make the thickness of the contact lenses in order to increase the drug loading capacity of the contact lens. However, for silicon-based lenses this parameter is inversely proportion to oxygen permeability (i.e. as thickness of the contact lens increases the oxygen permeability decreases). Moreover, it has been shown that as water content increases in silicon-based lenses, the oxygen permeability decreases, another relationship that is inversely proportional. Surprisingly, as SCLs increase with water content the oxygen permeability also increases (a directly proportional relationship).

In regards to whether silicon-based lenses or SCLs are a better candidate as an ophthalmic drug delivery device is a question that remains unanswered and is not uniformly agreed upon in the scientific community. For example, Ciolino et al. claim that silicon-based contact lenses are better candidates for patients that are long-term contact lens wearer. Conversely, Kim et al. suggest that SCLs are better candidates because they show the possibility to be able to overcome the difficult of oxygen permeability as well as mechanical integrity of the lens. Kim et al. have shown that the mechanical strength can be increased for SCLs by incorporating a nanodiamond (ND) infrastructure into contact lens matrix.

Additionally, many researchers have investigated the implications of loading vitamin E into the contact lens matrix of SCLs. Although vitamin E incorporation into the matrix has been shown to slow the release of drugs into the eye and onto cornea (a desirable trait of an ophthalmic delivery system), it has also been shown to decrease oxygen permeability. Oxygen permeability continues to be an extremely important factor in the development of these devices and is one of the main reason that much research is beginning to focus on this area of drug delivery.

=== Water content ===
The amount of water content that a particular contact lens can retain is another extremely important factor that must be taken into account when these devices are designed. Research in this specific area of design suggests that contact lens wearers find it more comfortable to wear lenses that retain water more than those that deter water. For SCLs, as the water content of a lens increases so does the oxygen permeability. Conversely, as the water content increases in silicon-based contact lenses, the oxygen permeability decreases. In reference to SCLs, higher water content in contact lenses allows for easier loading using the supercritical soaking method. This could be due to the water acting as a lubricant to some drugs and allowing the drug to be more easily facilitated into the matrix. This would essentially allow for more drug to be loaded into contact lenses of this type. This increase in drug loading capacity is an important advancement and would allow for patients wince it may allow for a longer period of drug release time and would hopefully be more sustained.

Furthermore, Guzman-Aranguez et al. has shown that when using the molecular imprinting method for loading drugs such as ketotifen and norfloxacin into the contact lens, the water content is not largely impacted. Additionally, it has been predicted by Peng et al. by using Fickian release kinetic models that although water content changes once contact lenses are inserted onto the cornea of the eye, this will not pose significant challenges when it comes to the release of rugs from SCLs.

=== Drug release kinetics ===
The most important factor that must be taken into account when designing any type of drug delivery device, and specifically ocular devices, is the release rate of a drug. As discussed previously, the deliver rate and kinetics associated with drugs to the eye can reach levels that are toxic to the eye or could even cause undesirable side effects. The rate of release of a drug is also important because too slow of a release could have no beneficial outcome for the patient and a release that is too quick could result in negative side effects. Thus, it is important to balance the factors that govern the release of drugs from contact lenses as potential drug delivery devices. Researchers such as C. Alvarez-Lorenzo have tested (with animal models) and have data which supports that molecularly imprinted contact lenses release drugs in a sustained and long period of time. It has also been supported by researchers that the rate of drug release can be controlled by incorporating vitamin E within the hydrogen matrix.

=== Systemic side effects ===
Over time, it has been reported that many of the same drugs and eye drops used to treat particular eye diseases do, in fact, result in systemic side effects that could possibly be minimized or limited due to a slower, more sustained release of the drug. The systemic side effects of glaucoma medications such as latanoprost increased heart rate resulting in cardiac arrhythmias, bronchoconstriction, and hypotension. These complications could be life-threatening. Some other drugs that help to reduce the effects of glaucoma in the eye result in vomiting, diarrhea, tachycardia and bronchospasm. It has been found that some drugs delivered in the form of eye drops are highly toxic to children since their total body volume and tissue volumes are much lower than that of an adult for which the drugs are intended for use. In this case, some parents are not aware of these implications and could use the same drug they would use to help treat their children's bacterial infections in the eye. Moreover, some drugs administered to the eye have been shown to result in cardiac depression and propagation of some disorders such as asthma. With continued research in this area, it has become known that skin irritation, itching or rash are commonly associated with drugs used to treat ocular bacterial infections.

== Ocular disorders ==
There are currently four main ocular disorders that have been heavily investigated and have shown success with using contact lenses as possible devices for molecular drug delivery.

=== Bacterial infection ===
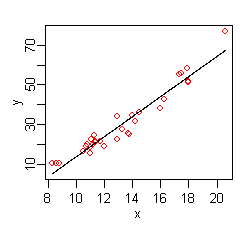
Figure 5.0 - Example of zero-order release kinetics (y = % of drug released from contact lens; x = time (days))

The drug release rate is extremely important in treating many diseased states of the eye, bacterial infections being one of them. Ciprofloxacin and norfloxacin are drugs that are normally used to treat bacterial infections of the eye. It is of utmost importance that these drugs stay in the therapeutic window for an extended period of time in order to be fully effective and kill bacteria. To keep the specific drug in the therapeutic window using eye drops the topical must be applied approximately every 30 minutes in order to be fully effective. Having to apply eye drops every 30 minutes would be nearly impossible for anyone and is not the ideal mechanism by which to deliver such drugs to the eye. Researchers have gathered data to support the idea that silicon-based contact lenses with ciprofloxacin could release the drug in the therapeutic window for approximately one month. Ana Guzman-Aranguez et al. also confirmed that the contact lens used also retained important properties such as transparency, oxygen permeability, mechanical strength, and zero-order release pharmacokinetics.

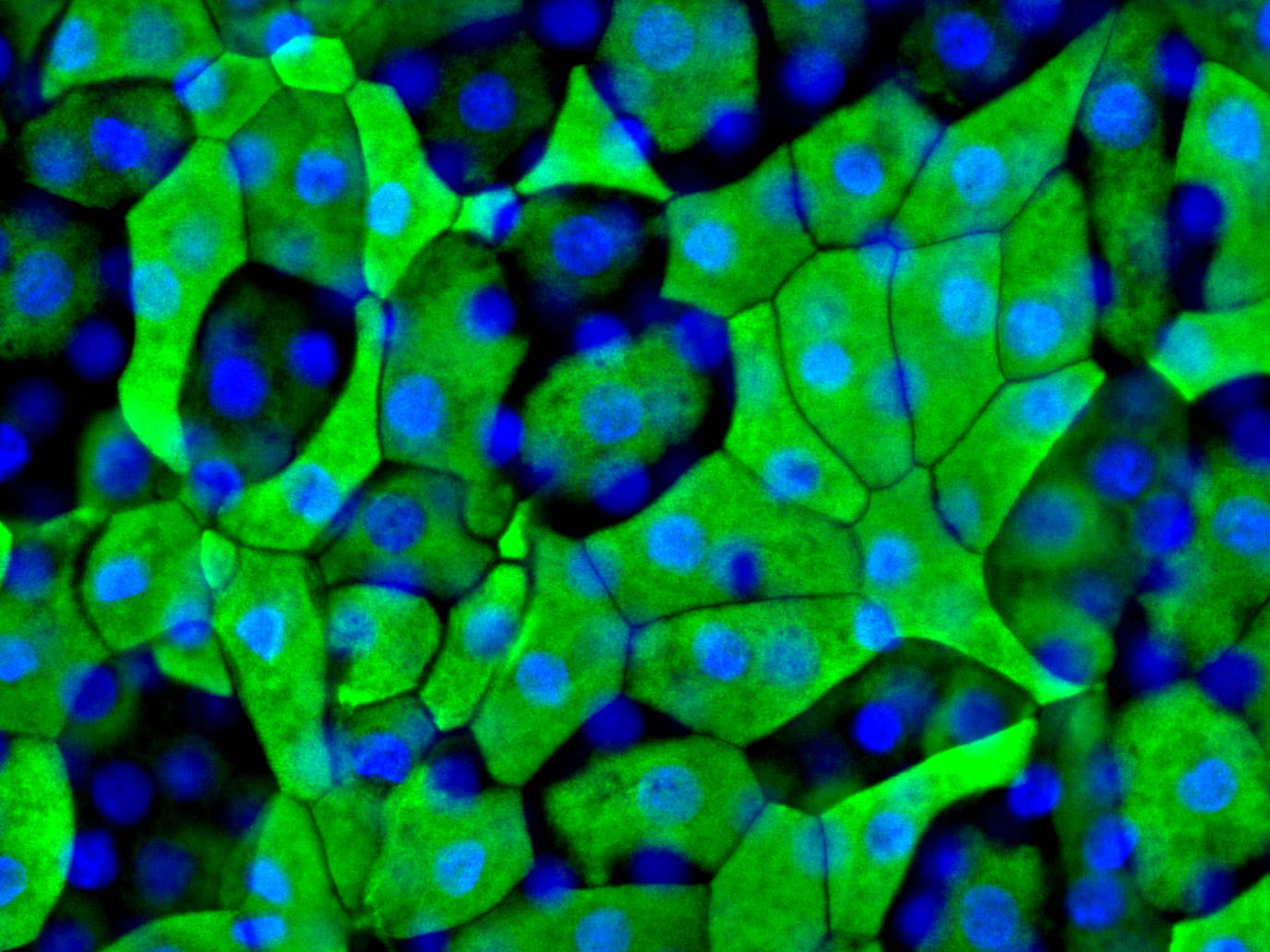
Figure 6.0 - Cornea epithelium

=== Corneal injury ===
Many factors can result in corneal injury and cause the deterioration or death of cells that make up the cornea of the eye. The epithelial cells that make up the cornea are important in order for normal vision. These cells play a role in creating a physical environment that can correctly bend light rays to help project images to the retina of the eye. There have been successful human clinical trials with using SCLs infused with epidermal growth factor (EGF) that showed increased rate of healing of the epithelial cell layer of the cornea.

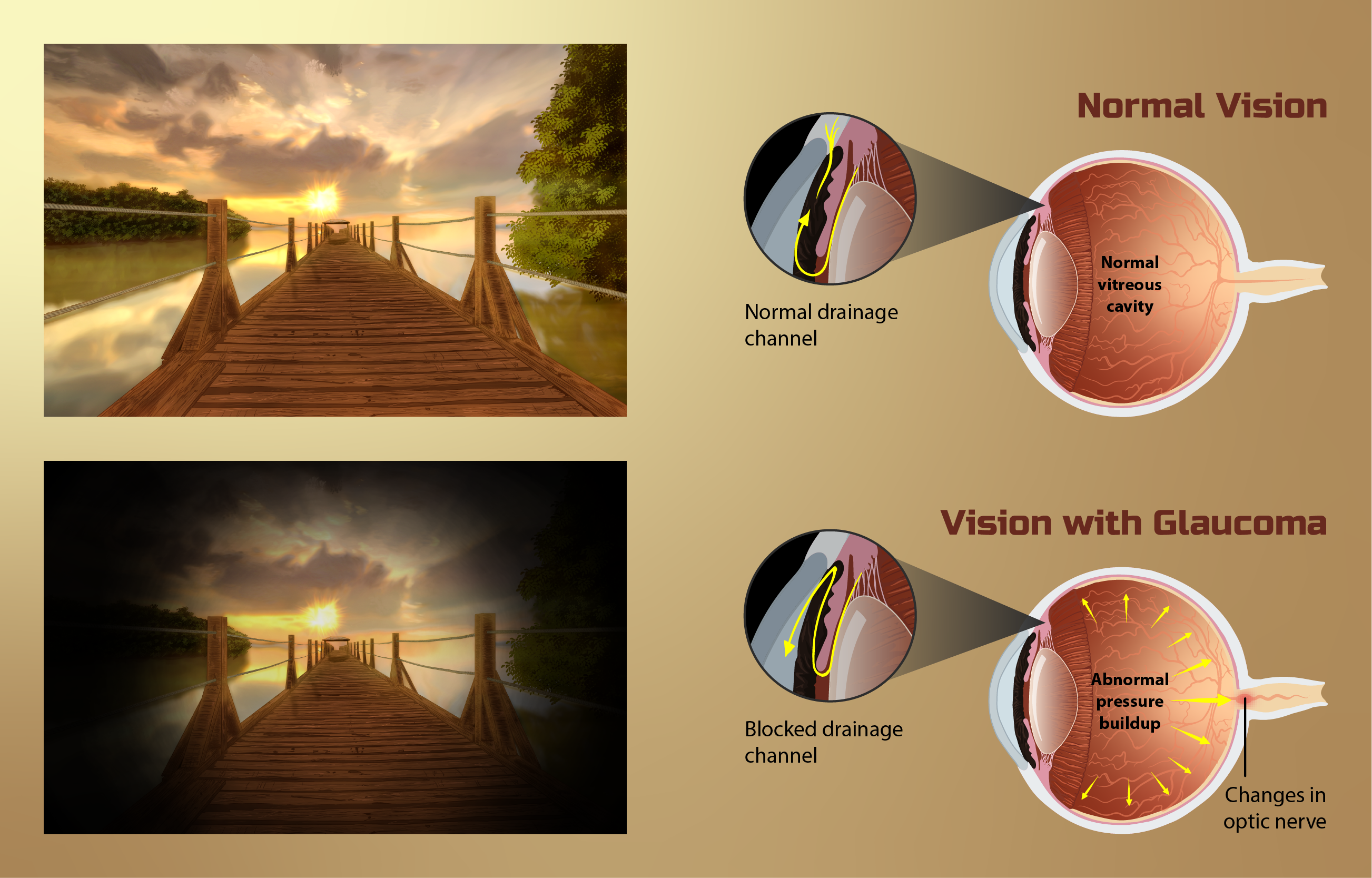
Figure 7.0 - Glaucoma complications

=== Glaucoma ===
Glaucoma is the leading cause of blindness in the world and is a progressive and irreversible disease of the eye. A poly(lactic-co-glycolic acid)-based contact lens was shown to release latanoprost at a sustained release rate of up to a month in animal models by Ciolino et al. at Harvard Medical School and Massachusetts Institute of Technology. Latanoprost is one of the drug interventions used to treat patients with glaucoma, generally in the form of topicals such as eye drops.

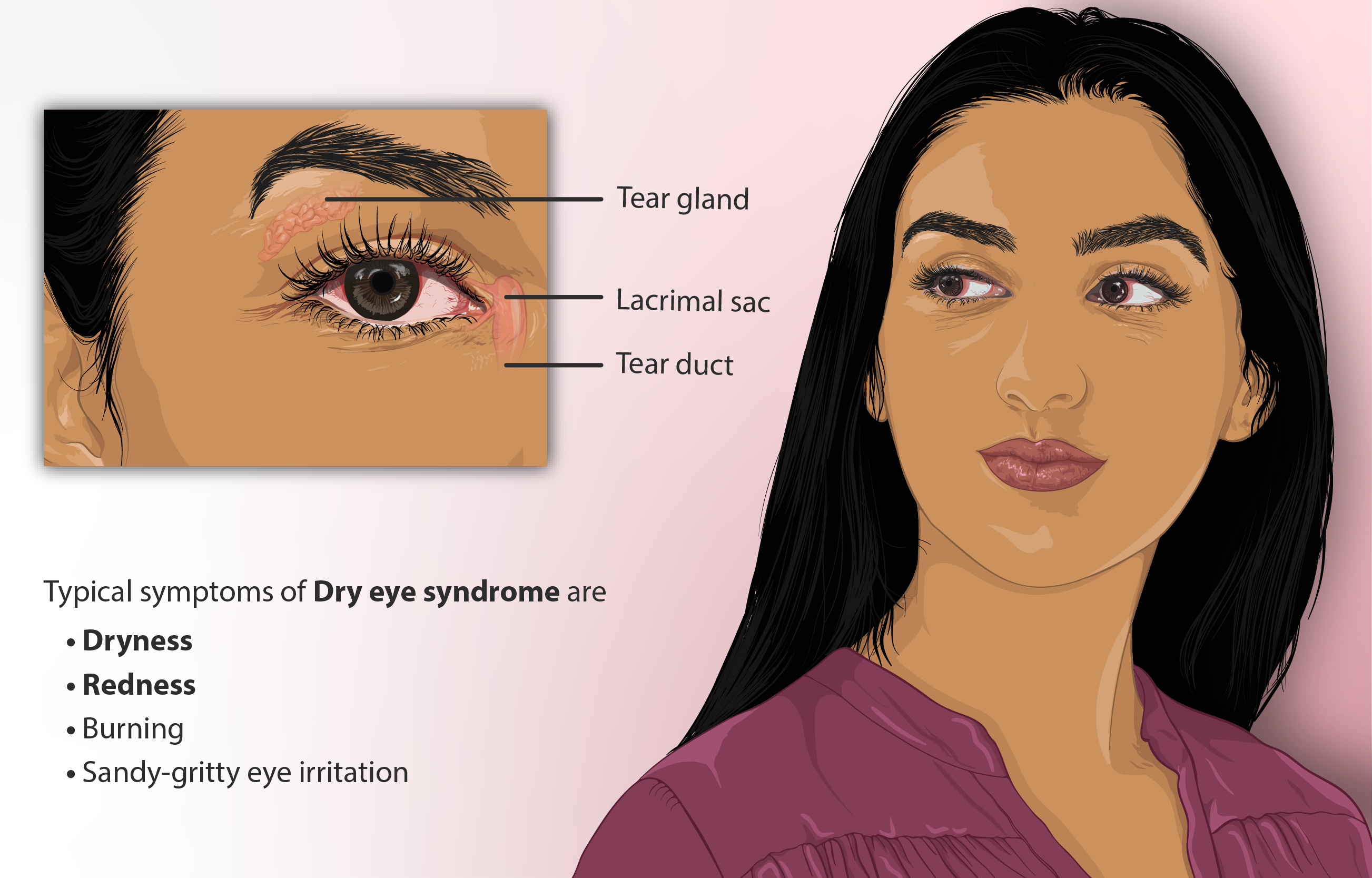
Figure 8.0 - Dry eye syndrome complications

=== Dry eye ===
More than 50% of all contact lens wearers report that they experience dry eye. In order to help combat this issue and be assured that this does not occur in people that will one day be using drug eluting contact lenses, it is important to make sure that this complication is highly investigated. However, these investigations will not only be beneficial for contact lenses as drug delivery devices, but it will also have positive implications on contact lens wearers who use lenses for vision correction and appearance.

Index: Scientific Terms in Context of Ocular Drug Delivery
Term	Definition
pH responsive system	the ability for a biological system to undergo changes that promote activity, inactivity, release of compound(s), or degradation as a result of changes made in the pH of the microenvironment of a certain system
nasolacrimal drainage	drainage of particles/fluids into the body via the tear (nasolacrimal) duct
systemic	of or relating to the entire body
zero-order kinetics	release of a drug from a delivery device at a singular and constant rate the entire time of release
Timolol (1-[(2-methyl-2-propanyl)amino]-3-{[4-(4-morpholinyl)-1,2,5-thiadiazol-3-yl]oxy}-2-propanol)	
Norfloxacin (1-ethyl-6-fluoro-4-oxo-7-(1-piperazinyl)-1,4-dihydro-3-quinolinecarboxylic acid)	
Ketotifen (10H-benzo(4,5)cyclohepta(1,2-b)thiophen-10-one, 4,9-dihydro-4-(1-methyl-4-piperidinylidene)	
Polyvinylpyrrolidone	
Hyaluronic acid	
Latanoprost (isopropyl-(Z) 7[(1R,2R,3R,5S)3,5-dihydroxy-2-[(3R)-3-hydroxy-5-phenylpentyl]cyclopentyl]-5-heptenoate)	
