= Fluorescein (medical use) =

Pharmaceutical drug

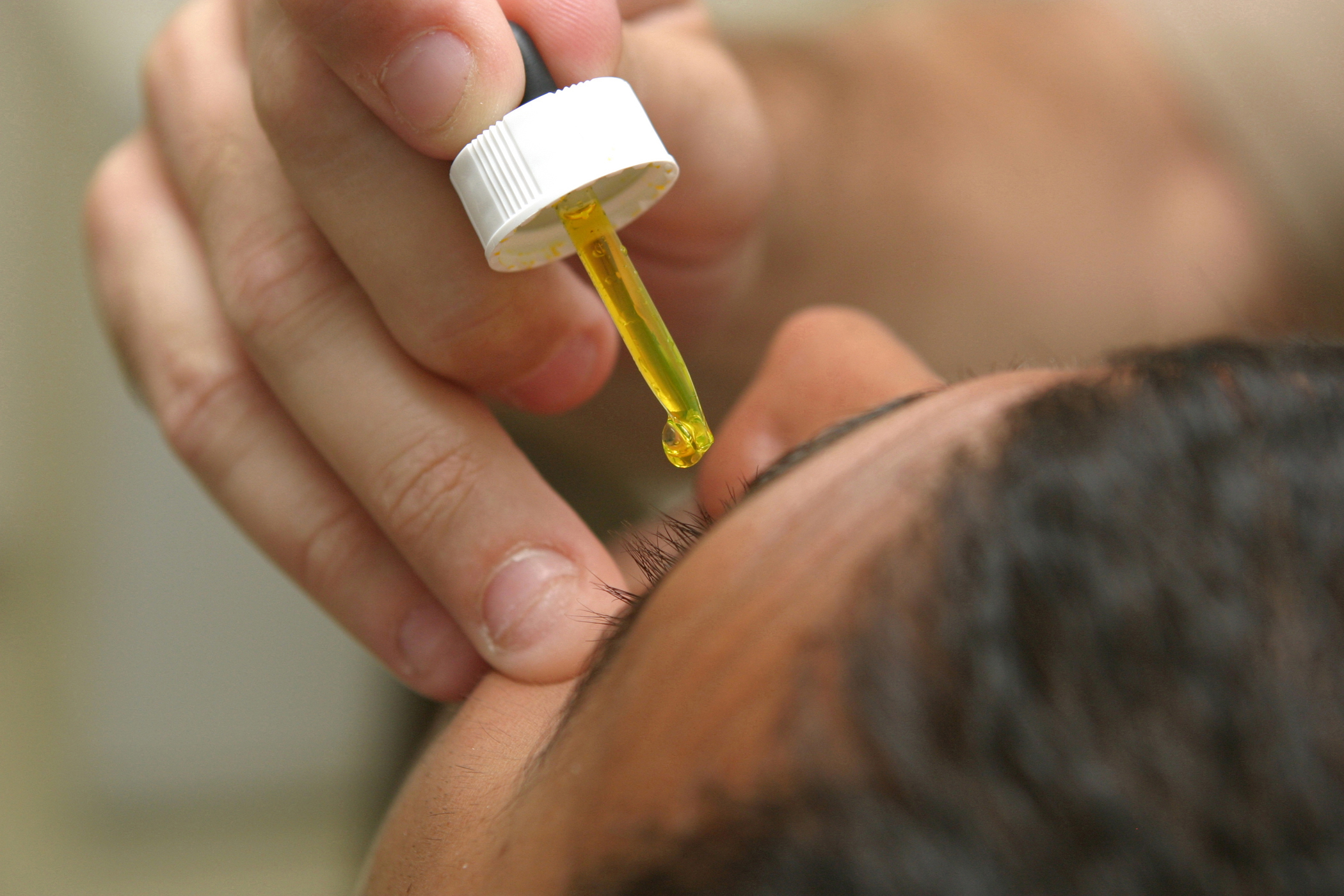
- Fluorescein drops being put in the eye before examination

Clinical data
- Pronunciation: /ˈflʊərəsiːn/
- Trade names: Fluorescite, AK-Fluor, BioGlo, others
- License data: US DailyMed: Fluorescein; US FDA: Fluorescein
- Routes of administration: Eye drops, intravenous, by mouth
- Drug class: Diagnostic agent
- ATC code: S01JA01 (WHO) S01JA51 (WHO)

Legal status
- Legal status: UK: POM (Prescription only); US: ℞-only; In general: ℞ (Prescription only)

Identifiers
- IUPAC name: 3',6'-dihydroxyspiro[2-benzofuran-3,9'-xanthene]-1-one
- CAS Number: 2321-07-5; sodium: 518-47-8
- PubChem CID: 16850
- DrugBank: DB00693
- ChemSpider: 15968
- UNII: TPY09G7XIR; sodium: 93X55PE38X
- KEGG: D01261; sodium: D02024
- ChEBI: CHEBI:31624
- ChEMBL: ChEMBL1057
- PDB ligand: FLU (PDBe, RCSB PDB)

Chemical and physical data
- Formula: C_{20}H_{12}O_{5}
- Molar mass: 332.311 g·mol^{−1}
- 3D model (JSmol): Interactive image
- SMILES: C1=CC=C2C(=C1)C(=O)OC23C4=C(C=C(C=C4)O)OC5=C3C=CC(=C5)O
- InChI: InChI=1S/C20H12O5/c21-11-5-7-15-17(9-11)24-18-10-12(22)6-8-16(18)20(15)14-4-2-1-3-13(14)19(23)25-20/h1-10,21-22H; Key:GNBHRKFJIUUOQI-UHFFFAOYSA-N

Fluorescein sodium, the sodium salt of fluorescein, is used to help in the diagnosis of a number of eye problems. When applied as a drop or within a strip of paper to the surface of the eye it is used to help detect eye injuries such as foreign bodies and corneal abrasions. When given by mouth or injection into a vein it is used to help evaluate the blood vessels in the back of the eye during fluorescein angiography.

When applied to the surface of the eye, side effects may include a brief period of blurry vision and discoloration of contact lenses of the soft type. When used by mouth or injection, side effects may include headache, nausea, and a change to the color of the skin for a brief period of time. Following application of fluorescein to the eye (such as to check for corneal scratches), the dye mixes with tears, flows through the nasolacrimal duct, and enters the nasal cavity, coloring any mucus present. The dye typically lasts a few minutes to 1–2 hours before washing out from the eye. Allergic reactions may rarely occur. Fluorescein is a dye which is taken up by damaged cornea such that the area appears green under cobalt blue light. There is also a version that comes premixed with lidocaine.

Fluorescein was first made in 1871. It is on the World Health Organization's List of Essential Medicines.

== Brand names ==
It is also sold as a combination drug with oxybuprocaine under the brand name Altafluor Benox.

== Other animals ==
It is also sometimes administered to pets in multi-pet environments to determine which pet needs behavioral modification.
