= Demecarium bromide =

Chemical compound

Clinical data
- Trade names: Humorsol
- Routes of administration: Topical (ophthalmic solution)
- ATC code: S01EB04 (WHO)

Identifiers
- IUPAC name: Trimethyl-[3-[methyl-[10-[methyl-(3-trimethylammoniophenoxy)carbonyl-amino]decyl]carbamoyl]oxyphenyl]ammonium dibromide
- CAS Number: 56-94-0
- PubChem CID: 5965
- DrugBank: DB00944
- ChemSpider: 5750
- UNII: 61D5V4OKTP
- KEGG: D00667
- ChEBI: CHEBI:4391
- ChEMBL: ChEMBL1200514
- CompTox Dashboard (EPA): DTXSID6045240
- ECHA InfoCard: 100.000.274

Chemical and physical data
- Formula: C_{32}H_{52}Br_{2}N_{4}O_{4}
- Molar mass: 716.600 g·mol^{−1}
- 3D model (JSmol): Interactive image
- SMILES: [Br-].[Br-].O=C(Oc1cccc(c1)[N+](C)(C)C)N(CCCCCCCCCCN(C(=O)Oc2cccc(c2)[N+](C)(C)C)C)C
- InChI: InChI=1S/C32H52N4O4.2BrH/c1-33(31(37)39-29-21-17-19-27(25-29)35(3,4)5)23-15-13-11-9-10-12-14-16-24-34(2)32(38)40-30-22-18-20-28(26-30)36(6,7)8;;/h17-22,25-26H,9-16,23-24H2,1-8H3;2*1H/q+2;;/p-2; Key:YHKBUDZECQDYBR-UHFFFAOYSA-L

Demecarium bromide, trade name Humorsol, is a carbamate parasympathomimetic drug that acts as an acetylcholinesterase inhibitor, and is used as a glaucoma medication. It is applied directly to the eye in order to reduce elevated intraocular pressure associated with glaucoma.

Demecarium causes constriction of the pupil (miosis), which improves the drainage of the fluid in the eye (aqueous humour). As demecarium reversibly inhibits cholinesterase, it can be administered less frequently than other parasympathomimetic drugs, such as carbachol.

Commercially produced demecarium bromide solution, previously sold under the trade name Humorsol, is no longer available, although solutions of demecarium can be compounded.

== Use in dogs ==
When administered with a topical corticosteroid, demecarium can delay the onset of primary glaucoma in dogs. High doses of demecarium may cause organophosphate toxicity, particularly if flea treatments containing organophosphates are administered at the same time.

== See also ==
- Diisopropyl fluorophosphate
