= Picloxydine =

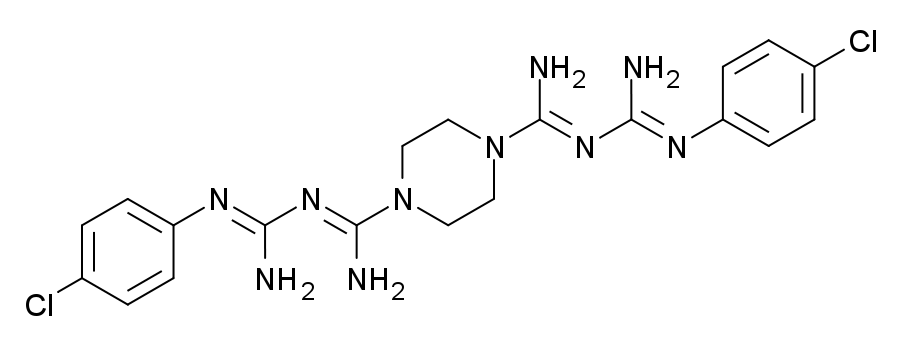

Names
- IUPAC name 1-N',4-N'-bis[N'-(4-chlorophenyl)carbamimidoyl]piperazine-1,4-dicarboximidamide

Identifiers
| CAS Number | 5636-92-0 |
| 3D model (JSmol) | Interactive image |
| ChEMBL | ChEMBL2104722 |
| ChemSpider | 64722 |
| ECHA InfoCard | 100.024.623 |
| PubChem CID | 71663 |
| UNII | 4YC2PY3AEU |
| CompTox Dashboard (EPA) | DTXSID50863586 |
- InChI: InChI=1S/C20H24Cl2N10/c21-13-1-5-15(6-2-13)27-17(23)29-19(25)31-9-11-32(12-10-31)20(26)30-18(24)28-16-7-3-14(22)4-8-16/h1-8H,9-12H2,(H4,23,25,27,29)(H4,24,26,28,30) Key: YNCLPFSAZFGQCD-UHFFFAOYSA-N; InChI=1/C20H24Cl2N10/c21-13-1-5-15(6-2-13)27-17(23)29-19(25)31-9-11-32(12-10-31)20(26)30-18(24)28-16-7-3-14(22)4-8-16/h1-8H,9-12H2,(H4,23,25,27,29)(H4,24,26,28,30) Key: YNCLPFSAZFGQCD-UHFFFAOYAM
- SMILES: C1CN(CCN1C(=NC(=NC2=CC=C(C=C2)Cl)N)N)C(=NC(=NC3=CC=C(C=C3)Cl)N)N

Properties
| Chemical formula | C_{20}H_{24}Cl_{2}N_{10} |
| Molar mass | 475.37756 |

Pharmacology
| ATC code | S01AX16 (WHO) |
- Except where otherwise noted, data are given for materials in their standard state (at 25 °C [77 °F], 100 kPa). verify (what is ?) Infobox references

Picloxydine (trade name Vitabact) is a bisbiguanide antiseptic used in eye drops. It is structurally similar to chlorhexidine.
