= ATC code H02 =

ATC code H02 Corticosteroids for systemic use is a therapeutic subgroup of the Anatomical Therapeutic Chemical Classification System, a system of alphanumeric codes developed by the World Health Organization (WHO) for the classification of drugs and other medical products. Subgroup H02 is part of the anatomical group H Systemic hormonal preparations, excluding sex hormones and insulins.

Codes for veterinary use (ATCvet codes) can be created by placing the letter Q in front of the human ATC code: for example, QH02. ATCvet codes without corresponding human ATC codes are cited with the leading Q in the following list.
National versions of the ATC classification may include additional codes not present in this list, which follows the WHO version.

== H02A Corticosteroids for systemic use, plain ==
=== H02AA Mineralocorticoids ===
H02AA01 Aldosterone
H02AA02 Fludrocortisone
H02AA03 Desoxycortone

=== H02AB Glucocorticoids ===
H02AB01 Betamethasone
H02AB02 Dexamethasone
H02AB03 Fluocortolone
H02AB04 Methylprednisolone
H02AB05 Paramethasone
H02AB06 Prednisolone
H02AB07 Prednisone
H02AB08 Triamcinolone
H02AB09 Hydrocortisone
H02AB10 Cortisone
H02AB11 Prednylidene
H02AB12 Rimexolone
H02AB13 Deflazacort
H02AB14 Cloprednol
H02AB15 Meprednisone
H02AB17 Cortivazol
H02AB18 Vamorolone
QH02AB30 Combinations of glucocorticoids
QH02AB56 Prednisolone, combinations
QH02AB57 Prednisone, combinations
QH02AB90 Flumetasone

== H02B Corticosteroids for systemic use, combinations ==
=== H02BX Corticosteroids for systemic use, combinations ===
H02BX01 Methylprednisolone, combinations
QH02BX90 Dexamethasone, combinations

== H02C Antiadrenal preparations ==
=== H02CA Anticorticosteroids ===
H02CA01 Trilostane
H02CA02 Osilodrostat
H02CA03 Ketoconazole
H02CA04 Levoketoconazole
