= Nepafenac =

NSAID analgesic and anti-inflammatory drug

Clinical data
- Trade names: Nevanac, Ilevro, Amnac, others
- AHFS/Drugs.com: Monograph
- MedlinePlus: a606007
- License data: EU EMA: by INN; US DailyMed: Nepafenac
- Pregnancy category: AU: C
- Routes of administration: Topical eye drops
- ATC code: S01BC10 (WHO)

Legal status
- Legal status: AU: S4 (Prescription only); US: ℞-only; In general: ℞ (Prescription only)

Identifiers
- IUPAC name: 2-amino-3-benzoylbenzeneacetamide
- CAS Number: 78281-72-8
- PubChem CID: 151075
- IUPHAR/BPS: 7564
- DrugBank: DB06802
- ChemSpider: 133160
- UNII: 0J9L7J6V8C
- KEGG: D05143
- ChEBI: CHEBI:75922
- ChEMBL: ChEMBL1021
- CompTox Dashboard (EPA): DTXSID0048638
- ECHA InfoCard: 100.207.414

Chemical and physical data
- Formula: C_{15}H_{14}N_{2}O_{2}
- Molar mass: 254.289 g·mol^{−1}
- 3D model (JSmol): Interactive image
- SMILES: O=C(c1cccc(c1N)CC(=O)N)c2ccccc2
- InChI: InChI=1S/C15H14N2O2/c16-13(18)9-11-7-4-8-12(14(11)17)15(19)10-5-2-1-3-6-10/h1-8H,9,17H2,(H2,16,18); Key:QEFAQIPZVLVERP-UHFFFAOYSA-N

Nepafenac, sold under the brand name Nevanac among others, is a nonsteroidal anti-inflammatory drug (NSAID), usually sold as a prescription eye drop 0.1% solution (Nevanac) or 0.3% solution (Ilevro). It is used to treat pain and inflammation associated with cataract surgery. Nepafenac is a prodrug of amfenac, an inhibitor of COX-1 and COX-2 activity.

== Medical uses ==
Nepafenac is indicated for use in the treatment of pain and inflammation following cataract surgery.

In the European Union nepafenac is also indicated for the reduction in the risk of postoperative macular edema associated with cataract surgery in people with diabetes.

== Pharmacology ==
=== Mechanism of action ===
Nepafenac is an NSAID, thought to be a prodrug of amfenac after conversion by ocular tissue hydrolases after penetration via the cornea. Amfenac, like other NSAIDs, is thought to inhibit cyclooxygenase action.

== Adverse events ==
Side effects include headache; runny nose; pain or pressure in the face; nausea; vomiting; and dry, itchy, sticky eyes. Serious side effects include red or bloody eyes; foreign body sensation in the eye; sensitivity to light; decreased visual acuity; seeing specks or spots; teary eyes; or eye discharge or crusting.

== Regulatory ==
=== Nevanac ===
On February 25, 2005, Alcon filed a New Drug Application (NDA) with the U.S. Food and Drug Administration (FDA) for Nevanac 0.1%. Results from the two trials referenced in the NDA (Phase 2/3 study C-02-53; Phase 3 study C-03-32) have not been published. Study C-02-53 consisted of 228 patients across 10 centers in the United States. Study C-03-32 consisted of 522 patients across 22 centers in the United States. The efficacy results presented were confirmed in a study published in 2007.

Nevanac was approved by the FDA on August 19, 2005, with application number 021–862.

=== Ilevro ===
An NDA for Ilevro was filed on December 15, 2011. In a one-month study, no new toxicities arose in the new formulation of nepafenac. Safety and efficacy information was derived from the previous Nevanac application. In June 2010, a confirmatory study began (Study C09055) consisting of over 2000 patients from 49 US sites and 37 European sites. A second phase 3 trial (Study C11003) was conducted in a population of 1,342 patients at 37 sites across the United States which failed to demonstrate superiority over Nevanac in an altered dosing regimen.

Ilevro was approved by the FDA on October 16, 2012, with application number 203–491.

== Commercialization ==
Both Nevanac and Ilevro are manufactured and sold by Alcon, Inc. Alcon is currently a division of Novartis International AG, which is primarily based out of Switzerland. Alcon, Inc. also holds locations in both Switzerland and the United States. The company has gone through several name changes, from Alcon Laboratories, Inc. to Alcon Universal, Ltd., to Alcon, Inc.

Nevanac entered the market in 2005 as a product of Alcon, at the time a subsidiary of Nestlé. On April 6, 2008, Novartis agreed to purchase approximately 74 million shares of Alcon from Nestlé at $143.18 per share. On January 4, 2010, Novartis agreed to purchase all remaining shares of Alcon from Nestlé, totalling 156 million shares or 77% of the shares in the company. At the time of the purchase, a proposal for a merger under Swiss merger law was given to the Alcon board of directors. The merger was agreed upon on December 15, 2010, making Alcon "the second largest division within Novartis." The merger was completed on April 8, 2011.

Ilevro was launched by Alcon on January 21, 2013. In 2014 and 2015, net sales by Alcon grew, contributed to in part by the increased volume in sales of Ilevro. That financial year, Novartis reported $18 billion in total financial debt. That figure has grown steadily since. In 2016, Novartis reported a total debt of $23.8 billion, up from the $21.9 billion reported in 2015 and the $20.4 billion reported in 2014. As of May 2017, Novartis is estimated to be worth $193.2 billion.

On January 27, 2016, Alcon was moved to become a branch of the Innovative Medicines Division at Novartis. Early in 2016, Alcon formed agreements with both TrueVision and PowerVision, and acquired Transcend Medical. As of January 2017, Novartis is weighing options for Alcon in the business structure.

=== Commercial risks ===
Alcon faced declining growth in 2016, having faced challenges in development and marketing of new products.

=== Marketing ===
Novartis maintains a detailing unit geared toward health professionals consisting of over 3,000 employees within the United States and an additional 21,000 worldwide. Novartis is also seeking to expand direct-to-consumer advertising and entrance into specialty product markets. Novartis also notes the influence of position and preference on US Centers for Medicare & Medicaid formularies in expanding their market value.

Nepafenac, Nevanac, and Ilevro are all absent from the 2016 Annual Report issued from Novartis.

=== Intellectual property ===
There are currently seven U.S. patents filed that are directly associated with the modernized formulations of nepafenac, all stemming from Novartis. There are three patents associated with Nevanac that are still active and four associated with Ilevro. The earliest patent related to the modern formulations of nepafenac was approved on June 11, 2002, after being filed in 1999, by Bahram Asgharian. A patent was filed by Warren Wong, associated with Alcon, Inc. based out of Fort Worth, Texas, on December 2, 2005, for aqueous suspensions of nepafenac. Another patent for a nepafenac-based drug was filed on May 8, 2006, by Geoffrey Owen, Amy Brooks, and Gustav Graff. A patent was filed by Masood A. Chowhan and Huagang Chen on February 9, 2007, and approved on May 24, 2011, followed closely by a patent filed by Warren Wong on September 23, 2010, and approved on December 6, 2011. Masood A. Chowhan, Malay Ghosh, Bahram Asgharian, and Wesley Wehsin Han filed another patent on December 1, 2010, and approved on December 30, 2014. The most recent patent was filed by Masood A. Chowhan, Malay Ghosh, Bahram Asgharian, and Wesley Weshin Han on November 12, 2014, and approved on May 30, 2017. These patents are in effect until dates ranging between July 17, 2018, and March 31, 2032.

Novartis also maintains patents on nepafenac in 26 countries outside the United States.
