= Dapiprazole =

Chemical compound

Clinical data
- AHFS/Drugs.com: Consumer Drug Information
- MedlinePlus: a601043
- Pregnancy category: B
- Routes of administration: Topical (eye drops)
- ATC code: S01EX02 (WHO)

Legal status
- Legal status: In general: ℞ (Prescription only)

Pharmacokinetic data
- Bioavailability: Negligible when administered topically

Identifiers
- IUPAC name: 3-{2-[4-(2-methylphenyl)piperazin-1-yl]ethyl}-5,6,7,8-tetrahydro-[1,2,4]triazolo[4,5-a]pyridine
- CAS Number: 72822-12-9
- PubChem CID: 3033538
- IUPHAR/BPS: 7155
- DrugBank: DB00298
- ChemSpider: 2298190
- UNII: 5RNZ8GJO7K
- KEGG: D07775
- ChEBI: CHEBI:51066
- ChEMBL: ChEMBL1201216
- CompTox Dashboard (EPA): DTXSID90223140

Chemical and physical data
- Formula: C_{19}H_{27}N_{5}
- Molar mass: 325.460 g·mol^{−1}
- 3D model (JSmol): Interactive image
- SMILES: n1nc(n2c1CCCC2)CCN4CCN(c3ccccc3C)CC4
- InChI: InChI=1S/C19H27N5/c1-16-6-2-3-7-17(16)23-14-12-22(13-15-23)11-9-19-21-20-18-8-4-5-10-24(18)19/h2-3,6-7H,4-5,8-15H2,1H3; Key:RFWZESUMWJKKRN-UHFFFAOYSA-N

Dapiprazole (brand name Rev-Eyes) is an alpha-1 blocker. It is used to reverse mydriasis after eye examination.
