= Rimexolone =

Pharmaceutical drug

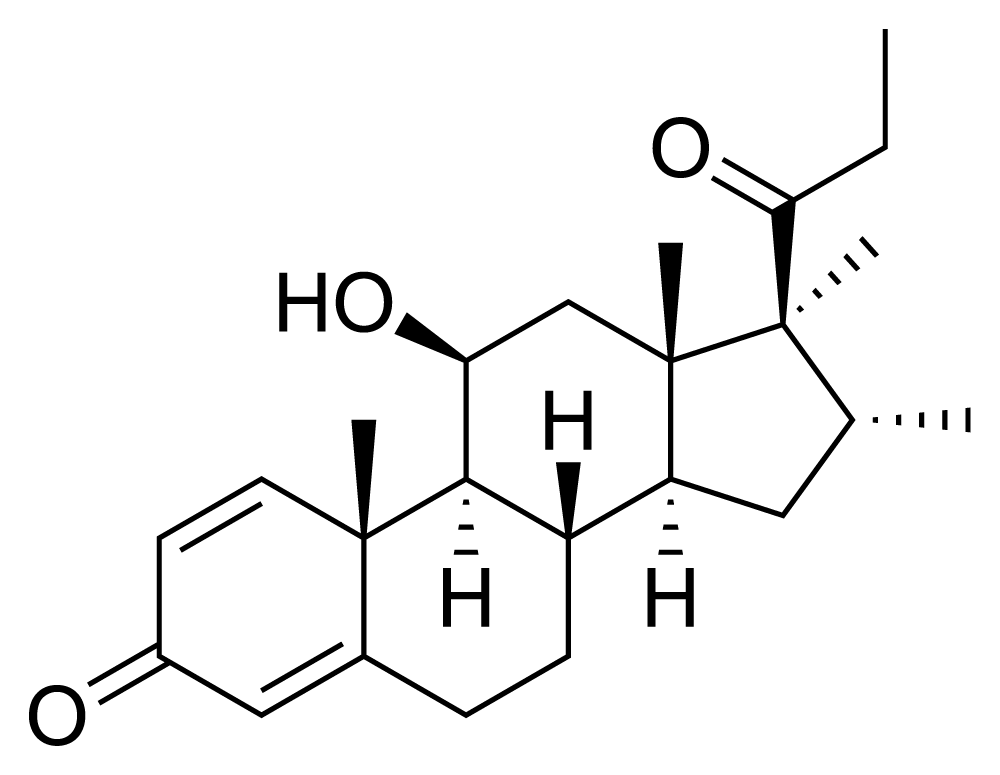

Clinical data
- Trade names: Vexol
- Other names: Trimexolone; Org 6216; 11β-Hydroxy-16α,17α,21-trimethylpregna-1,4-dien-3,20-dione
- AHFS/Drugs.com: Monograph
- MedlinePlus: a606003
- Routes of administration: Eye drops
- ATC code: H02AB12 (WHO) S01BA13 (WHO)

Pharmacokinetic data
- Elimination half-life: estimated 1–2 hours
- Excretion: >80% faeces

Identifiers
- IUPAC name: (8S,9S,10R,11S,13S,14S,16R,17S)-11-Hydroxy-10,13,16,17-tetramethyl-17-propanoyl-7,8,9,11,12,14,15,16-octahydro-6H-cyclopenta[a]phenanthren-3-one
- CAS Number: 49697-38-3
- PubChem CID: 5311412
- IUPHAR/BPS: 7099
- DrugBank: DB00896
- ChemSpider: 4470902
- UNII: O7M2E4264D
- KEGG: D05729
- ChEMBL: ChEMBL1200617
- CompTox Dashboard (EPA): DTXSID4045474
- ECHA InfoCard: 100.211.227

Chemical and physical data
- Formula: C_{24}H_{34}O_{3}
- Molar mass: 370.533 g·mol^{−1}
- 3D model (JSmol): Interactive image
- SMILES: CCC(=O)[C@]1([C@@H](C[C@@H]2[C@@]1(C[C@@H]([C@H]3[C@H]2CCC4=CC(=O)C=C[C@]34C)O)C)C)C
- InChI: InChI=1S/C24H34O3/c1-6-20(27)24(5)14(2)11-18-17-8-7-15-12-16(25)9-10-22(15,3)21(17)19(26)13-23(18,24)4/h9-10,12,14,17-19,21,26H,6-8,11,13H2,1-5H3/t14-,17+,18+,19+,21-,22+,23+,24-/m1/s1; Key:QTTRZHGPGKRAFB-OOKHYKNYSA-N

Rimexolone is a glucocorticoid steroid used to treat inflammation in the eye. It is marketed as a 1% eye drop suspension under the trade name Vexol by Alcon Laboratories, but was discontinued in the US and other countries.

== Medical uses ==
Rimexolone is used to treat inflammation after eye surgery, to treat anterior uveitis, conjunctivitis and keratitis.

== Contraindications ==
The substance is contraindicated in herpes simplex and most other viral eye infections, as well as mycobacterial, fungal and amoebal eye infections because it only reduces the inflammation but does not act against such microorganisms.

== Side effects ==
The most common adverse effects are blurred vision, tearing and other kinds of eye discomfort. Eye pain, eye oedema, headache, increased intraocular pressure and other side effects are seen in less than 1% of patients.

== Pharmacology ==
=== Pharmacodynamics ===
As a glucocorticoid, rimexolone acts as an agonist of the glucocorticoid receptor.

=== Pharmacokinetics ===
A small amount of rimexolone is absorbed into the systemic circulation. On hourly treatment with the eye drops for a week, blood serum concentrations peaked at 150 pg/ml on average, with many patients remaining below the detection threshold of 80 pg/ml. The elimination half-life from the circulation is estimated at one to two hours; the substance is mainly (over 80%) excreted via the faeces.
