= C21H25ClO5 =

The molecular formula C_{21}H_{25}ClO_{5} (molar mass: 392.87 g/mol, exact mass: 392.1391 u) may refer to:

- Cloprednol
- Chloroprednisone
