= Brimonidine =

Chemical compound

Clinical data
- Pronunciation: /brɪˈmoʊnɪdiːn/ bri-MOH-nid-een
- Trade names: Alphagan, Mirvaso, Lumify, others
- AHFS/Drugs.com: Monograph
- MedlinePlus: a601232
- License data: US DailyMed: Brimonidine
- Pregnancy category: AU: B3
- Routes of administration: Topical
- ATC code: D11AX21 (WHO) S01EA05 (WHO), S01EA55 (WHO), S01GA07 (WHO)

Legal status
- Legal status: AU: S4 (Prescription only) / Schedule 2; US: ℞-only / OTC

Pharmacokinetic data
- Metabolism: Primarily liver
- Elimination half-life: 3 hours (ocular), 12 hours (topical)

Identifiers
- IUPAC name: 5-Bromo-N-(4,5-dihydro-1H-imidazol-2-yl) quinoxalin-6-amine
- CAS Number: 59803-98-4
- PubChem CID: 2435
- IUPHAR/BPS: 520
- DrugBank: DB00484
- ChemSpider: 2341
- UNII: E6GNX3HHTE
- KEGG: D07540
- ChEBI: CHEBI:3175
- ChEMBL: ChEMBL844
- CompTox Dashboard (EPA): DTXSID3045221
- ECHA InfoCard: 100.149.042

Chemical and physical data
- Formula: C_{11}H_{10}BrN_{5}
- Molar mass: 292.140 g·mol^{−1}
- 3D model (JSmol): Interactive image
- Melting point: 252 °C (486 °F)
- SMILES: Brc2c1nccnc1ccc2N/C3=N/CCN3
- InChI: InChI=1S/C11H10BrN5/c12-9-7(17-11-15-5-6-16-11)1-2-8-10(9)14-4-3-13-8/h1-4H,5-6H2,(H2,15,16,17); Key:XYLJNLCSTIOKRM-UHFFFAOYSA-N

Brimonidine is an α_{2} agonist medication used to treat open-angle glaucoma, ocular hypertension, and rosacea. In rosacea it improves the redness. It is used as eye drops or applied to the skin. It is also available in the fixed-dose combination medication brimonidine/timolol along with timolol maleate.

Common side effects when used in the eyes include itchiness, redness, and a dry mouth. Common side effects when used on the skin include redness, burning, and headaches. More significant side effects may include allergic reactions and low blood pressure. Use in pregnancy appears to be safe. When applied to the eye it works by decreasing the amount of aqueous humor made while increasing the amount that drains from the eye. When applied to the skin it works by causing blood vessels to contract.

Brimonidine was patented in 1972 and came into medical use in 1996. It is available as a generic medication. In 2023, it was the 213th most commonly prescribed medication in the United States, with more than 2 million prescriptions.

== Medical uses ==
Brimonidine is indicated for the lowering of intraocular pressure in people with open-angle glaucoma or ocular hypertension. It is also used to reduce redness of the eye. The gel is indicated for the topical treatment of persistent (nontransient) facial erythema of rosacea in adults 18 years of age or older.

A 2017 Cochrane review found insufficient evidence to determine if brimonidine slows optic nerve damage.

== Mechanism of action ==
Brimonidine is an α_{2} adrenergic agonist.

Peripheral α_{2} agonist activity results in vasoconstriction of blood vessels (as opposed to central α_{2} agonist activity that decreases sympathetic tone, as can be seen by the medication clonidine). This vasoconstriction may explain the acute reduction in aqueous humor flow. The increased uveoscleral outflow from prolonged use may be explained by increased prostaglandin release due to α adrenergic stimulation. This may lead to relaxed ciliary muscle and increased uveoscleral outflow.

== Society and culture ==
=== Names ===
It is sold under the brand names Alphagan, Alphagan-P, Mirvaso, Lumify, Brymont, and others.
