= ATC code S01 =

ATC code S01 Ophthalmologicals is a therapeutic subgroup of the Anatomical Therapeutic Chemical Classification System, a system of alphanumeric codes developed by the World Health Organization (WHO) for the classification of drugs and other medical products. Subgroup S01 is part of the anatomical group S Sensory organs.

Codes for veterinary use (ATCvet codes) can be created by placing the letter Q in front of the human ATC code: for example, QS01. ATCvet codes without corresponding human ATC codes are cited with the leading Q in the following list.
National versions of the ATC classification may include additional codes not present in this list, which follows the WHO version.

== S01A Antiinfectives ==
=== S01AA Antibiotics ===
S01AA01 Chloramphenicol
S01AA02 Chlortetracycline
S01AA03 Neomycin
S01AA04 Oxytetracycline
S01AA05 Tyrothricin
S01AA07 Framycetin
S01AA09 Tetracycline
S01AA10 Natamycin
S01AA11 Gentamicin
S01AA12 Tobramycin
S01AA13 Fusidic acid
S01AA14 Benzylpenicillin
S01AA15 Dihydrostreptomycin
S01AA16 Rifamycin
S01AA17 Erythromycin
S01AA18 Polymyxin B
S01AA19 Ampicillin
S01AA20 Antibiotics in combination with other drugs
S01AA21 Amikacin
S01AA22 Micronomicin
S01AA23 Netilmicin
S01AA24 Kanamycin
S01AA25 Azidamfenicol
S01AA26 Azithromycin
S01AA27 Cefuroxime
S01AA28 Vancomycin
S01AA29 Dibekacin
S01AA30 Combinations of different antibiotics
S01AA31 Cefmenoxime
S01AA32 Bacitracin
QS01AA90 Cloxacillin

=== S01AB Sulfonamides ===
S01AB01 Sulfamethizole
S01AB02 Sulfafurazole
S01AB03 Sulfadicramide
S01AB04 Sulfacetamide
S01AB05 Sulfafenazol

=== S01AD Antivirals ===
S01AD01 Idoxuridine
S01AD02 Trifluridine
S01AD03 Aciclovir
S01AD05 Interferon
S01AD06 Vidarabine
S01AD07 Famciclovir
S01AD08 Fomivirsen
S01AD09 Ganciclovir

=== S01AE Fluoroquinolones ===
S01AE01 Ofloxacin
S01AE02 Norfloxacin
S01AE03 Ciprofloxacin
S01AE04 Lomefloxacin
S01AE05 Levofloxacin
S01AE06 Gatifloxacin
S01AE07 Moxifloxacin
S01AE08 Besifloxacin
S01AE09 Tosufloxacin

=== S01AX Other antiinfectives ===
S01AX01 Mercury compounds
S01AX02 Silver compounds
S01AX03 Zinc compounds
S01AX04 Nitrofural
S01AX05 Bibrocathol
S01AX06 Resorcinol
S01AX07 Sodium borate
S01AX08 Hexamidine
S01AX09 Chlorhexidine
S01AX10 Sodium propionate
S01AX14 Dibrompropamidine
S01AX15 Propamidine
S01AX16 Picloxydine
S01AX18 Povidone-iodine
S01AX24 Polihexanide
S01AX25 Lotilaner
S01AX26 Cethexonium

== S01B Antiinflammatory agents ==
=== S01BA Corticosteroids, plain ===
S01BA01 Dexamethasone
S01BA02 Hydrocortisone
S01BA03 Cortisone
S01BA04 Prednisolone
S01BA05 Triamcinolone
S01BA06 Betamethasone
S01BA07 Fluorometholone
S01BA08 Medrysone
S01BA09 Clobetasone
S01BA10 Alclometasone
S01BA11 Desonide
S01BA12 Formocortal
S01BA13 Rimexolone
S01BA14 Loteprednol
S01BA15 Fluocinolone acetonide
S01BA16 Difluprednate
S01BA17 Clobetasol

=== S01BB Corticosteroids and mydriatics in combination ===
S01BB01 Hydrocortisone and mydriatics
S01BB02 Prednisolone and mydriatics
S01BB03 Fluorometholone and mydriatics
S01BB04 Betamethasone and mydriatics

=== S01BC Antiinflammatory agents, non-steroids ===
S01BC01 Indometacin
S01BC02 Oxyphenbutazone
S01BC03 Diclofenac
S01BC04 Flurbiprofen
S01BC05 Ketorolac
S01BC06 Piroxicam
S01BC07 Bendazac
S01BC08 Salicylic acid
S01BC09 Pranoprofen
S01BC10 Nepafenac
S01BC11 Bromfenac

== S01C Antiinflammatory agents and antiinfectives in combination ==
=== S01CA Corticosteroids and antiinfectives in combination ===
S01CA01 Dexamethasone and antiinfectives
S01CA02 Prednisolone and antiinfectives
S01CA03 Hydrocortisone and antiinfectives
S01CA04 Fluocortolone and antiinfectives
S01CA05 Betamethasone and antiinfectives
S01CA06 Fludrocortisone and antiinfectives
S01CA07 Fluorometholone and antiinfectives
S01CA08 Methylprednisolone and antiinfectives
S01CA09 Chloroprednisone and antiinfectives
S01CA10 Fluocinolone acetonide and antiinfectives
S01CA11 Clobetasone and antiinfectives
S01CA12 Loteprednol and antiinfectives

=== S01CB Corticosteroids/antiinfectives/mydriatics in combination ===
S01CB01 Dexamethasone
S01CB02 Prednisolone
S01CB03 Hydrocortisone
S01CB04 Betamethasone
S01CB05 Fluorometholone

=== S01CC Antiinflammatory agents, non-steroids and antiinfectives in combination ===
S01CC01 Diclofenac and antiinfectives
S01CC02 Indometacin and antiinfectives

== S01E Antiglaucoma preparations and miotics ==
=== S01EA Sympathomimetics in glaucoma therapy ===
S01EA01 Epinephrine
S01EA02 Dipivefrine
S01EA03 Apraclonidine
S01EA04 Clonidine
S01EA05 Brimonidine
S01EA51 Epinephrine, combinations
S01EA55 Brimonidine and ripasudil

=== S01EB Parasympathomimetics ===
S01EB01 Pilocarpine
S01EB02 Carbachol
S01EB03 Ecothiopate
S01EB04 Demecarium
S01EB05 Physostigmine
S01EB06 Neostigmine
S01EB07 Fluostigmine
S01EB08 Aceclidine
S01EB09 Acetylcholine
S01EB10 Paraoxon
S01EB51 Pilocarpine, combinations
S01EB58 Aceclidine, combinations

=== S01EC Carbonic anhydrase inhibitors ===
S01EC01 Acetazolamide
S01EC02 Diclofenamide
S01EC03 Dorzolamide
S01EC04 Brinzolamide
S01EC05 Methazolamide
S01EC54 Brinzolamide, combinations

=== S01ED Beta blocking agents ===
S01ED01 Timolol
S01ED02 Betaxolol
S01ED03 Levobunolol
S01ED04 Metipranolol
S01ED05 Carteolol
S01ED06 Befunolol
S01ED51 Timolol, combinations
S01ED52 Betaxolol, combinations
S01ED54 Metipranolol, combinations
S01ED55 Carteolol, combinations

=== S01EE Prostaglandin analogues ===
S01EE01 Latanoprost
S01EE02 Unoprostone
S01EE03 Bimatoprost
S01EE04 Travoprost
S01EE05 Tafluprost
S01EE06 Latanoprostene bunod
S01EE51 Latanoprost and netarsudil
S01EE52 Latanoprost and dorzolamide

=== S01EX Other antiglaucoma preparations ===
S01EX01 Guanethidine
S01EX02 Dapiprazole
S01EX05 Netarsudil
S01EX06 Omidenepag
S01EX07 Ripasudil

== S01F Mydriatics and cycloplegics ==
=== S01FA Anticholinergics ===
S01FA01 Atropine
S01FA02 Scopolamine
S01FA03 Methylscopolamine
S01FA04 Cyclopentolate
S01FA05 Homatropine
S01FA06 Tropicamide
S01FA54 Cyclopentolate, combinations
S01FA56 Tropicamide, combinations

=== S01FB Sympathomimetics excluding antiglaucoma preparations ===
S01FB01 Phenylephrine
S01FB02 Ephedrine
S01FB03 Ibopamine
S01FB51 Phenylephrine and ketorolac
QS01FB90 Oxedrine
QS01FB99 Sympathomimetics, combinations

== S01G Decongestants and antiallergics ==
=== S01GA Sympathomimetics used as decongestants ===
S01GA01 Naphazoline
S01GA02 Tetryzoline
S01GA03 Xylometazoline
S01GA04 Oxymetazoline
S01GA05 Phenylephrine
S01GA06 Oxedrine
S01GA07 Brimonidine
S01GA51 Naphazoline, combinations
S01GA52 Tetryzoline, combinations
S01GA53 Xylometazoline, combinations
S01GA55 Phenylephrine, combinations
S01GA56 Oxedrine, combinations

=== S01GX Other antiallergics ===
S01GX01 Cromoglicic acid
S01GX02 Levocabastine
S01GX03 Spaglumic acid
S01GX04 Nedocromil
S01GX05 Lodoxamide
S01GX06 Emedastine
S01GX07 Azelastine
S01GX08 Ketotifen
S01GX09 Olopatadine
S01GX10 Epinastine
S01GX11 Alcaftadine
S01GX12 Cetirizine
S01GX13 Bilastine
S01GX51 Cromoglicic acid, combinations

== S01H Local anesthetics ==
=== S01HA Local anesthetics ===
S01HA01 Cocaine
S01HA02 Oxybuprocaine
S01HA03 Tetracaine
S01HA04 Proxymetacaine
S01HA05 Procaine
S01HA06 Cinchocaine
S01HA07 Lidocaine
S01HA08 Chloroprocaine
S01HA30 Combinations

== S01J Diagnostic agents ==
=== S01JA Colouring agents ===
S01JA01 Fluorescein
S01JA02 Rose bengal sodium
S01JA51 Fluorescein, combinations

== S01K Surgical aids ==
=== S01KA Viscoelastic substances ===
S01KA01 Hyaluronic acid
S01KA02 Hypromellose
S01KA51 Hyaluronic acid, combinations

=== S01KX Other surgical aids ===
S01KX01 Chymotrypsin
S01KX02 Trypan blue

== S01L Ocular vascular disorder agents ==
=== S01LA Antineovascularisation agents ===
S01LA01 Verteporfin
S01LA02 Anecortave
S01LA03 Pegaptanib
S01LA04 Ranibizumab
S01LA05 Aflibercept
S01LA06 Brolucizumab
S01LA07 Abicipar pegol
S01LA08 Bevacizumab
S01LA09 Faricimab

== S01X Other ophthalmologicals ==
=== S01XA Other ophthalmologicals ===
S01XA01 Guaiazulene
S01XA02 Retinol
S01XA03 Sodium chloride, hypertonic
S01XA04 Potassium iodide
S01XA05 Sodium edetate
S01XA06 Ethylmorphine
S01XA07 Alum
S01XA08 Acetylcysteine
S01XA09 Iodoheparinate
S01XA10 Inosine
S01XA11 Nandrolone
S01XA12 Dexpanthenol
S01XA13 Alteplase
S01XA14 Heparin
S01XA15 Ascorbic acid
S01XA18 Ciclosporin
S01XA19 Limbal stem cells, autologous
S01XA20 Artificial tears and other indifferent preparations
S01XA21 Mercaptamine
S01XA22 Ocriplasmin
S01XA23 Sirolimus
S01XA24 Cenegermin
S01XA25 Lifitegrast
S01XA26 Riboflavin
S01XA27 Voretigene neparvovec
S01XA28 Varenicline
S01XA29 Sepofarsen
S01XA31 Pegcetacoplan
S01XA32 Avacincaptad pegol
S01XA33 Diquafosol
QS01XA91 Pirenoxin
