= Azidamfenicol =

Chemical compound

Clinical data
- AHFS/Drugs.com: International Drug Names
- Routes of administration: Topical (ocular)
- ATC code: S01AA25 (WHO)

Legal status
- Legal status: In general: ℞ (Prescription only)

Identifiers
- IUPAC name: 2-azido-N-((1R,2R)-1,3-dihydroxy-1-(4-nitrophenyl)propan-2-yl)acetamide
- CAS Number: 13838-08-9
- PubChem CID: 62858
- ChemSpider: 56590
- UNII: 40257685LM
- KEGG: D07411
- ChEMBL: ChEMBL278788
- CompTox Dashboard (EPA): DTXSID90160647
- ECHA InfoCard: 100.034.125

Chemical and physical data
- Formula: C_{11}H_{13}N_{5}O_{5}
- Molar mass: 295.255 g·mol^{−1}
- 3D model (JSmol): Interactive image
- Melting point: 99 to 107 °C (210 to 225 °F)
- SMILES: [N-]=[N+]=N\CC(=O)N[C@@H]([C@H](O)c1ccc([N+]([O-])=O)cc1)CO
- InChI: InChI=1S/C11H13N5O5/c12-15-13-5-10(18)14-9(6-17)11(19)7-1-3-8(4-2-7)16(20)21/h1-4,9,11,17,19H,5-6H2,(H,14,18)/t9-,11-/m1/s1; Key:SGRUZFCHLOFYHZ-MWLCHTKSSA-N

Azidamfenicol is an amphenicol antibiotic, which has similar profile to chloramphenicol. It is used only topically, as eye drops and ointment for treatment of susceptible bacterial infections.
