= Metipranolol =

Pair of enantiomers

Clinical data
- Trade names: Optipranolol
- AHFS/Drugs.com: Micromedex Detailed Consumer Information
- MedlinePlus: a601078
- ATC code: S01ED04 (WHO) C07BA68 (WHO)

Identifiers
- IUPAC name: (RS)-4-{[-2-hydroxy-3-(isopropylamino)propyl]oxy}-2,3,6-trimethylphenyl acetate
- CAS Number: 22664-55-7
- PubChem CID: 31477
- IUPHAR/BPS: 7239
- DrugBank: DB01214
- ChemSpider: 29193
- UNII: X39AL81KEB
- KEGG: D02374
- ChEMBL: ChEMBL1291
- CompTox Dashboard (EPA): DTXSID4046078
- ECHA InfoCard: 100.041.031

Chemical and physical data
- Formula: C_{17}H_{27}NO_{4}
- Molar mass: 309.406 g·mol^{−1}
- 3D model (JSmol): Interactive image
- Chirality: Racemic mixture
- SMILES: O=C(Oc1c(c(c(OCC(O)CNC(C)C)cc1C)C)C)C
- InChI: InChI=1S/C17H27NO4/c1-10(2)18-8-15(20)9-21-16-7-11(3)17(22-14(6)19)13(5)12(16)4/h7,10,15,18,20H,8-9H2,1-6H3; Key:BQIPXWYNLPYNHW-UHFFFAOYSA-N

Metipranolol (OptiPranolol, Betanol, Disorat, Trimepranol) is a non-selective beta blocker used in eye drops to treat glaucoma. It is rapidly metabolized into desacetylmetipranolol.
