= Epinastine =

Pair of enantiomers

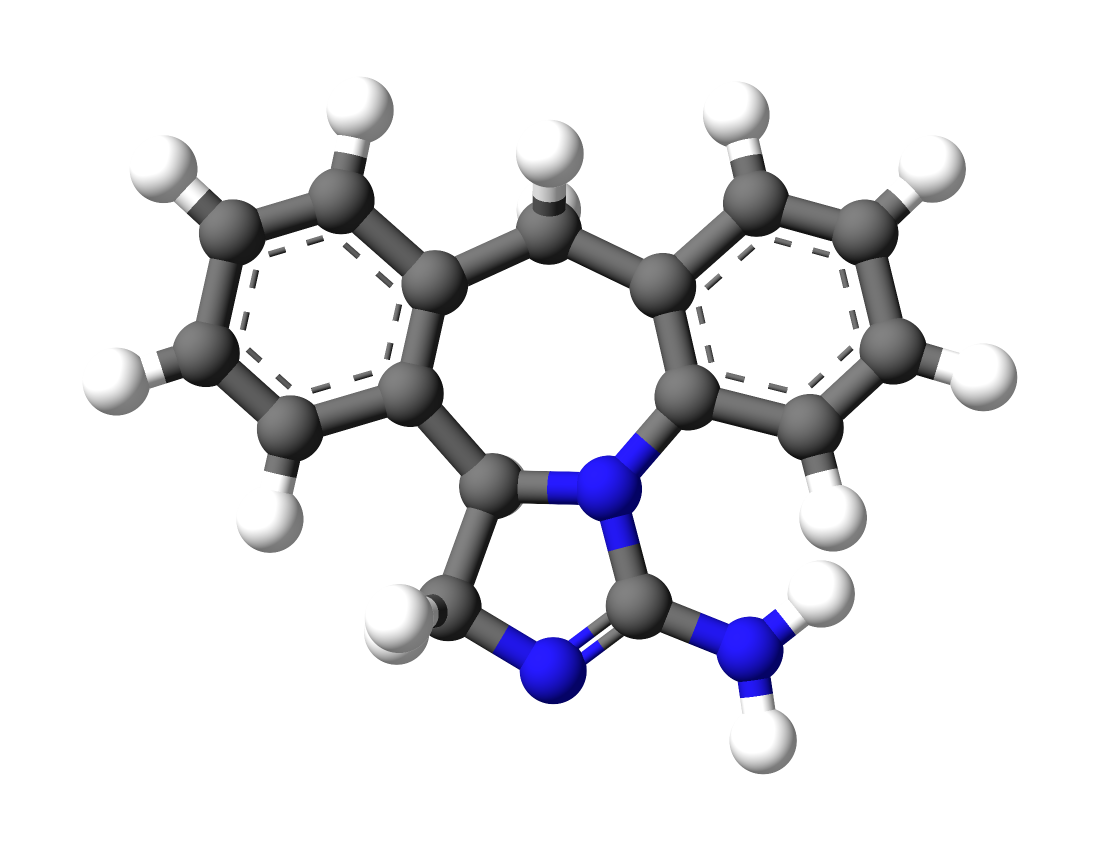

Clinical data
- Trade names: Alesion, Elestat, Purivist, Relestat
- AHFS/Drugs.com: Monograph
- MedlinePlus: a604011
- Pregnancy category: C
- Routes of administration: Eye drops
- ATC code: R06AX24 (WHO) S01GX10 (WHO)

Pharmacokinetic data
- Protein binding: 64%
- Elimination half-life: 12 hours

Identifiers
- IUPAC name: (RS)-3-amino-9,13b-dihydro-1H-dibenz(c,f)imidazo(1,5-a)azepine
- CAS Number: 80012-43-7
- PubChem CID: 3241
- IUPHAR/BPS: 7176
- DrugBank: DB00751
- ChemSpider: 3128
- UNII: Q13WX941EF
- KEGG: D07900
- ChEBI: CHEBI:51032
- ChEMBL: ChEMBL1106
- CompTox Dashboard (EPA): DTXSID2048371
- ECHA InfoCard: 100.120.187

Chemical and physical data
- Formula: C_{16}H_{15}N_{3}
- Molar mass: 249.317 g·mol^{−1}
- 3D model (JSmol): Interactive image
- SMILES: N\4=C(\N3c1c(cccc1)Cc2c(cccc2)C3C/4)N
- InChI: InChI=1S/C16H15N3/c17-16-18-10-15-13-7-3-1-5-11(13)9-12-6-2-4-8-14(12)19(15)16/h1-8,15H,9-10H2,(H2,17,18); Key:WHWZLSFABNNENI-UHFFFAOYSA-N

Epinastine (brand names Alesion, Elestat, Purivist, Relestat) is a second-generation antihistamine and mast cell stabilizer that is used in eye drops to treat allergic conjunctivitis. It is produced by Allergan and marketed by Inspire in the United States. It is highly selective for the H_{1} receptor and does not cross the blood-brain-barrier.

It was patented in 1980 and came into medical use in 1994.
