= Cortivazol =

Chemical compound

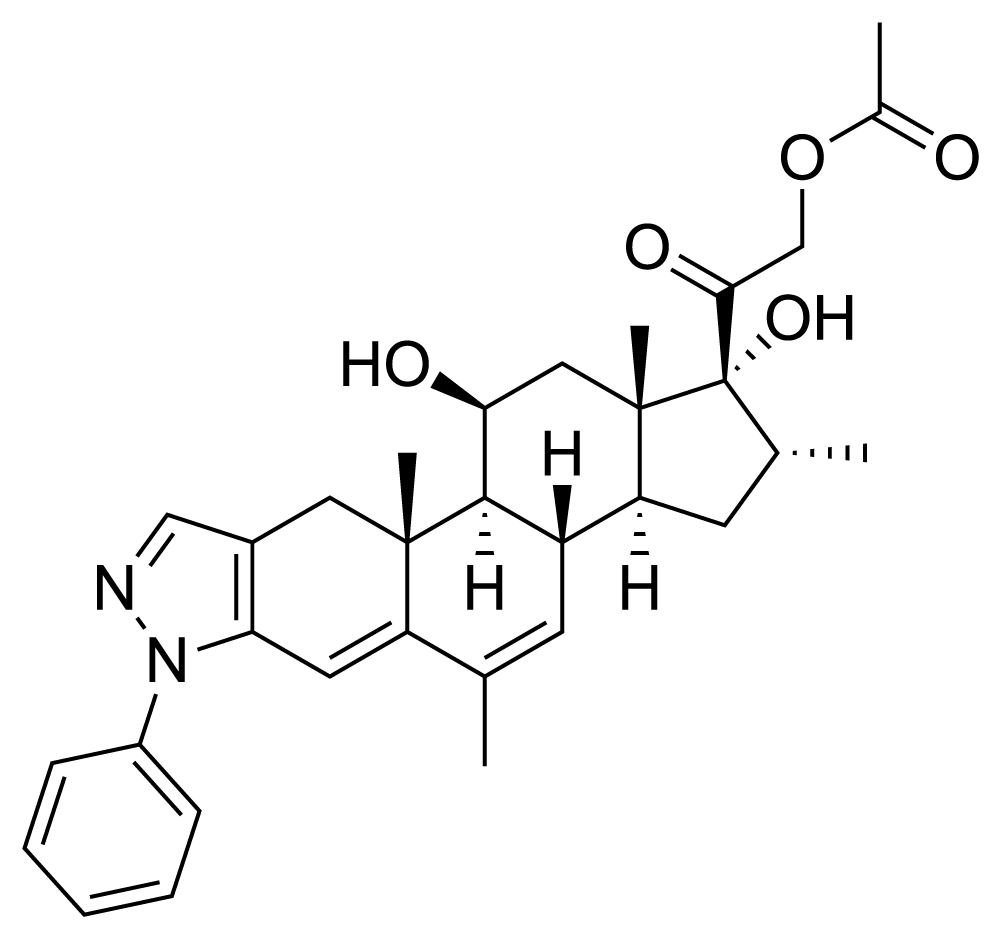

Clinical data
- AHFS/Drugs.com: International Drug Names
- ATC code: H02AB17 (WHO)

Identifiers
- IUPAC name: (11β,16α)-21-(Acetyloxy)-11,17-dihydroxy-6,16-dimethyl-2'-phenyl-2'H-pregna-2,4,6-trieno[3,2-c]pyrazol-20-one
- CAS Number: 1110-40-3
- PubChem CID: 66249
- ChemSpider: 59633
- UNII: YM183K0H63
- KEGG: D03594
- ChEMBL: ChEMBL2105842
- CompTox Dashboard (EPA): DTXSID40149442
- ECHA InfoCard: 100.012.887

Chemical and physical data
- Formula: C_{32}H_{38}N_{2}O_{5}
- Molar mass: 530.665 g·mol^{−1}
- 3D model (JSmol): Interactive image
- SMILES: O=C(OCC(=O)[C@@]4(O)[C@H](C)C[C@H]5[C@@H]6/C=C(\C3=C\c1c(cnn1c2ccccc2)C[C@@]3([C@H]6[C@@H](O)C[C@]45C)C)C)C
- InChI: InChI=1S/C32H38N2O5/c1-18-11-23-25-12-19(2)32(38,28(37)17-39-20(3)35)31(25,5)15-27(36)29(23)30(4)14-21-16-33-34(26(21)13-24(18)30)22-9-7-6-8-10-22/h6-11,13,16,19,23,25,27,29,36,38H,12,14-15,17H2,1-5H3/t19-,23+,25+,27+,29-,30+,31+,32+/m1/s1; Key:RKHQGWMMUURILY-UHRZLXHJSA-N

Cortivazol is a high-affinity agonist ligand for the glucocorticoid receptor and consequently is classified as a glucocorticoid.

It is sometimes abbreviated "CVZ".
