= Omidenepag =

Medication

Clinical data
- Trade names: Eybelis, others
- Other names: UR-7276, DE-117, Omidenepag isopropyl (JAN JP)
- Routes of administration: Topical eye drops
- ATC code: S01EX06 (WHO)

Legal status
- Legal status: US: ℞-only; Rx-only

Identifiers
- IUPAC name: Propan-2-yl 2-[[6-[[(4-pyrazol-1-ylphenyl)methyl-pyridin-3-ylsulfonylamino]methyl]pyridin-2-yl]amino]acetate
- CAS Number: 1187451-41-7; 1187451-19-9
- PubChem CID: 44230575; 44230999
- DrugBank: DB15071
- ChemSpider: 44210451; 57643658
- UNII: Z95F9F9LU4; G0G0H52U6K
- KEGG: D10965; D10966
- ChEMBL: ChEMBL3707245; ChEMBL4297666

Chemical and physical data
- Formula: C_{26}H_{28}N_{6}O_{4}S
- Molar mass: 520.61 g·mol^{−1}
- 3D model (JSmol): Interactive image
- SMILES: CC(C)OC(=O)CNC1=CC=CC(CN(CC2=CC=C(C=C2)N2C=CC=N2)S(=O)(=O)C2=CC=CN=C2)=N1
- InChI: InChI=1S/C23H22N6O4S/c30-23(31)15-25-22-6-1-4-19(27-22)17-28(34(32,33)21-5-2-11-24-14-21)16-18-7-9-20(10-8-18)29-13-3-12-26-29/h1-14H,15-17H2,(H,25,27)(H,30,31); Key:YHGSTSNEOJUIRN-UHFFFAOYSA-N; InChI=1S/C26H28N6O4S/c1-20(2)36-26(33)17-28-25-8-3-6-22(30-25)19-31(37(34,35)24-7-4-13-27-16-24)18-21-9-11-23(12-10-21)32-15-5-14-29-32/h3-16,20H,17-19H2,1-2H3,(H,28,30); Key:VIQCWEGEHRBLAC-UHFFFAOYSA-N

Omidenepag, sold under the brand name Eybelis among others, is a medication used for the treatment of glaucoma and ocular hypertension.

Omidenepag was approved for medical use in Japan in 2018, and in the United States in September 2022.

== Medical uses ==
Omidenepag is indicated for the treatment of glaucoma and ocular hypertension.

== Adverse effects ==
The most common adverse effects of omidenepag are conjunctival hyperemia and macular edema, including cystoid macular edema.

== Pharmacology ==
Omidenepag isopropyl is a prodrug that is converted by hydrolysis of its isopropyl ester to the active metabolite omidenepag. Omidenepag is a selective prostaglandin E2 receptor agonist.

== History ==
Omidenepag was developed by Ube Industries and Santen Pharmaceutical.
