= C15H25NO3 =

The molecular formula C_{15}H_{25}NO_{3} (molar mass: 267.36 g/mol, exact mass: 267.183444) may refer to:

- Butaxamine
- Desacetylmetipranolol
- EEE (psychedelic)
- MBM (drug)
- Metoprolol
