= Dibekacin =

Chemical compound

Clinical data
- Trade names: Panimycin, Tokocin
- Other names: 3',4'-Dideoxykanamycin B
- AHFS/Drugs.com: International Drug Names
- ATC code: J01GB09 (WHO) S01AA29 (WHO)

Identifiers
- IUPAC name: (2S,3R,4S,5S,6R)-4-Amino-2-[(1S,2S,3R,4S,6R)-4,6-diamino-3-[(2R,3R,6S)-3-amino-6-(aminomethyl)oxan-2-yl]oxy-2-hydroxycyclohexyl]oxy-6-(hydroxymethyl)oxane-3,5-diol
- CAS Number: 34493-98-6
- PubChem CID: 470999
- ChemSpider: 413666
- UNII: 45ZFO9E525
- KEGG: D07811
- ChEMBL: ChEMBL560976
- PDB ligand: 84D (PDBe, RCSB PDB)
- CompTox Dashboard (EPA): DTXSID2022915
- ECHA InfoCard: 100.047.316

Chemical and physical data
- Formula: C_{18}H_{37}N_{5}O_{8}
- Molar mass: 451.521 g·mol^{−1}
- 3D model (JSmol): Interactive image
- SMILES: C1C[C@H]([C@H](O[C@@H]1CN)O[C@@H]2[C@H](C[C@H]([C@@H]([C@H]2O)O[C@@H]3[C@@H]([C@H]([C@@H]([C@H](O3)CO)O)N)O)N)N)N
- InChI: InChI=1S/C18H37N5O8/c19-4-6-1-2-7(20)17(28-6)30-15-8(21)3-9(22)16(14(15)27)31-18-13(26)11(23)12(25)10(5-24)29-18/h6-18,24-27H,1-5,19-23H2/t6-,7+,8-,9+,10+,11-,12+,13+,14-,15+,16-,17+,18+/m0/s1; Key:JJCQSGDBDPYCEO-XVZSLQNASA-N

Dibekacin (3',4'-dideoxykanamycin B) is an aminoglycoside antibiotic. It is a semisynthetic derivative of kanamycin developed by Hamao Umezawa and collaborators for Meiji Seika, and first patented in 1970. It has been sold under a wide variety of trade names globally, including Orbicin, Dibekacin Meiji, Panimycin, and Tokocin. Clinical trials have found it to be effective against E. coli, Klebsiella, Enterobacter, Serratia, and Pseudomonas aeruginosa.

It has been used in combination with sulbenicillin.
