= Tosufloxacin =

Chemical compound

Clinical data
- AHFS/Drugs.com: International Drug Names
- ATC code: J01MA22 (WHO) S01AE09 (WHO)

Identifiers
- IUPAC name: 7-(3-Aminopyrrolidin-1-yl)-1-(2,4-difluorophenyl)-6-fluoro-4-oxo-1,4-dihydro-1,8-naphthyridine-3-carboxylic acid
- CAS Number: 100490-36-6
- PubChem CID: 5517
- ChemSpider: 5316
- UNII: GHJ553KQPS
- KEGG: D02317
- ChEBI: CHEBI:77573
- ChEMBL: ChEMBL273348
- CompTox Dashboard (EPA): DTXSID2044135

Chemical and physical data
- Formula: C_{19}H_{15}F_{3}N_{4}O_{3}
- Molar mass: 404.349 g·mol^{−1}
- 3D model (JSmol): Interactive image
- SMILES: NC1CCN(C1)c1nc2n(cc(C(O)=O)c(=O)c2cc1F)-c1ccc(F)cc1F
- InChI: InChI=1S/C19H15F3N4O3/c20-9-1-2-15(13(21)5-9)26-8-12(19(28)29)16(27)11-6-14(22)18(24-17(11)26)25-4-3-10(23)7-25/h1-2,5-6,8,10H,3-4,7,23H2,(H,28,29); Key:WUWFMDMBOJLQIV-UHFFFAOYSA-N

Tosufloxacin is a fluoroquinolone antibiotic. It has a controversial safety profile in relation to other fluoroquinolones. It is associated with severe thrombocytopenia and nephritis, and hepatotoxicity. It is sold in Japan under the brand name Ozex.
