= C17H27NO4 =

The molecular formula C_{17}H_{27}NO_{4} (molar mass: 309.40 g/mol, exact mass: 309.1940 u) may refer to:

- Metipranolol
- Nadolol
