= Netarsudil/latanoprost =

Combination drug

Combination of
- Netarsudil: Rho kinase inhibitor
- Latanoprost: Prostaglandin F2α analogue

Clinical data
- Trade names: Rocklatan, Roclanda
- AHFS/Drugs.com: Professional Drug Facts
- License data: US DailyMed: Netarsudil and latanoprost
- Routes of administration: Eye drops
- ATC code: S01EE51 (WHO)

Legal status
- Legal status: US: ℞-only; EU: Rx-only

Identifiers
- KEGG: D11558

Netarsudil/latanoprost, sold under the brand name Rocklatan among others, is a fixed-dose combination medication use to treat elevated intraocular pressure (IOP) in people with open-angle glaucoma or ocular hypertension. It contains netarsudil mesylate and latanoprost. It is applied as eye drops to the eyes.

The most common side effects include conjunctival hyperaemia (red eye), pain at the site where the medicine was applied, cornea verticillata (deposits in the cornea, the transparent layer in front of the eye that covers the pupil and iris), pruritus (itching of the eye), erythema (reddening) and discomfort in the eye, increased lacrimation (watery eyes), and conjunctival haemorrhage (bleeding in the surface layer of the eye).

Netarsudil/latanoprost was approved for medical use in the United States in March 2019, and in the European Union in January 2021.

== Medical uses ==
Netarsudil/latanoprost is indicated for the reduction of elevated intraocular pressure (IOP) in adults with primary open-angle glaucoma or ocular hypertension.
