= Meprednisone =

Chemical compound

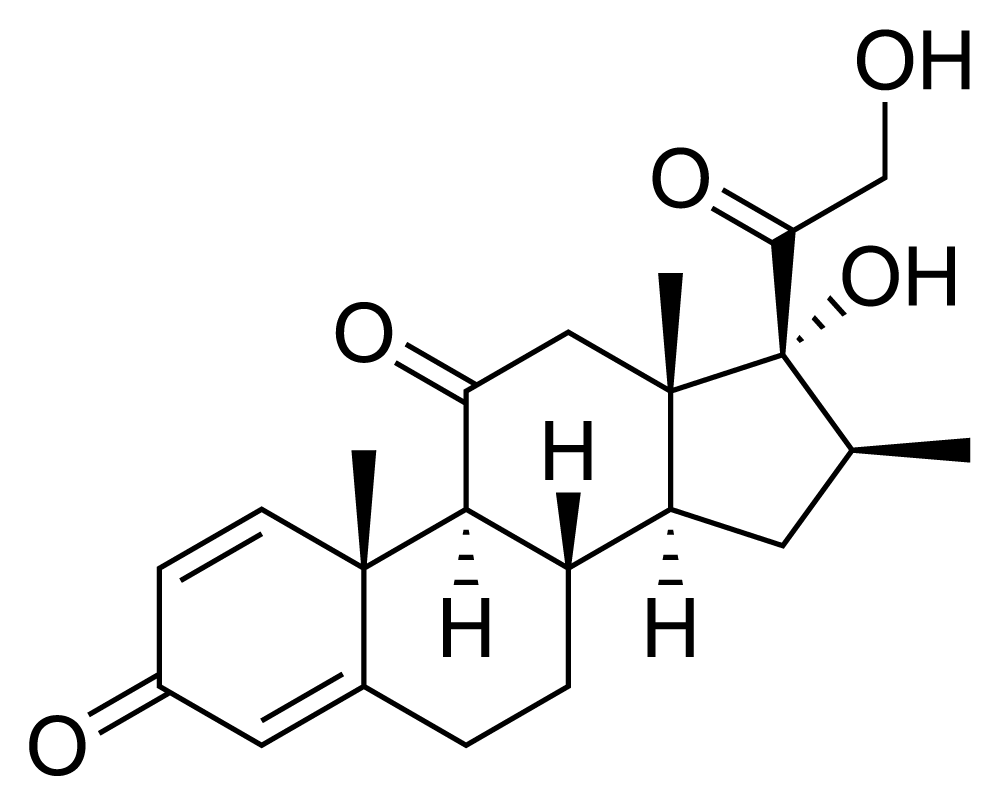

Clinical data
- Other names: 16-beta-Methylprednisone; Betalone; Betapar
- AHFS/Drugs.com: International Drug Names
- ATC code: H02AB15 (WHO)

Identifiers
- IUPAC name: (16β)-17,21-dihydroxy-16-methylpregna-1,4-diene-3,11,20-trione
- CAS Number: 1247-42-3
- PubChem CID: 5284587
- ChemSpider: 4447637
- UNII: 67U96J8P35
- KEGG: D06673
- ChEBI: CHEBI:135573
- ChEMBL: ChEMBL1201148
- CompTox Dashboard (EPA): DTXSID8023260
- ECHA InfoCard: 100.013.633

Chemical and physical data
- Formula: C_{22}H_{28}O_{5}
- Molar mass: 372.461 g·mol^{−1}
- 3D model (JSmol): Interactive image
- SMILES: O=C(CO)[C@@]3(O)[C@@H](C)C[C@H]2[C@@H]4CC\C1=C\C(=O)\C=C/[C@]1(C)[C@H]4C(=O)C[C@@]23C
- InChI: InChI=1S/C22H28O5/c1-12-8-16-15-5-4-13-9-14(24)6-7-20(13,2)19(15)17(25)10-21(16,3)22(12,27)18(26)11-23/h6-7,9,12,15-16,19,23,27H,4-5,8,10-11H2,1-3H3/t12-,15-,16-,19+,20-,21-,22-/m0/s1; Key:PIDANAQULIKBQS-RNUIGHNZSA-N

Meprednisone is a glucocorticoid. It is a methylated derivative of prednisone.

== See also ==
- Glucocorticoid
- Corticosteroid
