= Bibrocathol =

Chemical compound

Clinical data
- Trade names: Noviform, Posiformin
- Other names: Bibrocathin; Tetrabromopyrocatechol bismuth
- AHFS/Drugs.com: International Drug Names
- Routes of administration: Topical (eye ointment)
- ATC code: S01AX05 (WHO)

Identifiers
- IUPAC name: 4,5,6,7-tetrabromo-2-hydroxy-1,3,2-benzodioxabismole
- CAS Number: 6915-57-7
- PubChem CID: 16683103
- ChemSpider: 11232581
- UNII: 0KJ20H1BLJ
- ChEMBL: ChEMBL44875
- CompTox Dashboard (EPA): DTXSID701027244
- ECHA InfoCard: 100.027.294

Chemical and physical data
- Formula: C_{6}HBiBr_{4}O_{3}
- Molar mass: 649.667 g·mol^{−1}
- 3D model (JSmol): Interactive image
- SMILES: O[Bi]1Oc2c(Br)c(Br)c(Br)c(Br)c2O1
- InChI: InChI=1S/C6H2Br4O2.Bi.H2O/c7-1-2(8)4(10)6(12)5(11)3(1)9;;/h11-12H;;1H2/q;+3;/p-3; Key:VTAVFIZOZUAKKE-UHFFFAOYSA-K

Bibrocathol (INN; trade names Noviform and Posiformin) is a pharmaceutical antiseptic. Its chemical name is 4,5,6,7-tetrabrom-1,3,2-benzodioxabismol-2-ol. It contains bismuth and is used to treat eye infections and control swelling.
