= Proxymetacaine =

Chemical compound

Clinical data
- Trade names: Alcaine, others
- AHFS/Drugs.com: International Drug Names
- Routes of administration: Topical (eye drops)
- ATC code: S01HA04 (WHO)

Legal status
- Legal status: BR: Class C1 (Other controlled substances)

Pharmacokinetic data
- Metabolism: Plasma

Identifiers
- IUPAC name: 2-(diethylamino)ethyl 3-amino-4-propoxybenzoate
- CAS Number: 499-67-2 5875-06-9 (HCl)
- PubChem CID: 4935
- IUPHAR/BPS: 7283
- DrugBank: DB00807
- ChemSpider: 4766
- UNII: B4OB0JHI1X
- KEGG: D08448
- ChEMBL: ChEMBL1196
- CompTox Dashboard (EPA): DTXSID30198146
- ECHA InfoCard: 100.007.169

Chemical and physical data
- Formula: C_{16}H_{26}N_{2}O_{3}
- Molar mass: 294.395 g·mol^{−1}
- 3D model (JSmol): Interactive image
- SMILES: O=C(OCCN(CC)CC)c1ccc(OCCC)c(c1)N
- InChI: InChI=1S/C16H26N2O3/c1-4-10-20-15-8-7-13(12-14(15)17)16(19)21-11-9-18(5-2)6-3/h7-8,12H,4-6,9-11,17H2,1-3H3; Key:KCLANYCVBBTKTO-UHFFFAOYSA-N

Proxymetacaine (INN) or proparacaine (USAN) is a topical anesthetic drug of the aminoester group.

== Clinical pharmacology ==
Proxymetacaine is a local anesthetic which on topical application penetrates sensory nerve endings in the corneal tissue.

== Mechanism of action ==
Proxymetacaine is believed to act as an antagonist on voltage-gated sodium channels to affect the permeability of neuronal membranes; how this inhibits pain sensations and the exact mechanism of action of proxymetacaine are, however, unknown.

== Indications and usage ==
Proxymetacaine hydrochloride ophthalmic solution (eye drops) is indicated for procedures such as tonometry, gonioscopy, removal of foreign bodies, or other similar procedures requiring topical anesthesia of the cornea and conjunctiva.

== Warnings ==
Proxymetacaine is for topical ophthalmic use only, and it is specifically not intended for injection. Prolonged use of this or any other topical ocular anesthetic may produce permanent corneal opacification with accompanying visual loss.

== How supplied ==
Proxymetacaine is available as its hydrochloride salt in ophthalmic solutions at a concentration of 0.5%. Although it is no longer on patent, it is still marketed under the trade names Alcaine, Ak-Taine, and others. Proparacaine 0.5% is marketed as Poencaina by Poen Laboratories.
