= Formocortal =

Chemical compound

Clinical data
- Other names: 3-(2-chloroethoxy)-6-formyl-9α-fluoropregna-3,5-diene-11β,16α,17,21-tetrol-20-one 21-acetate
- ATC code: S01BA12 (WHO)

Identifiers
- IUPAC name: 2-[(1S,2S,4R,8S,9S,11S,12R,13S)-16-(2-chloroethoxy)-12-fluoro-19-formyl-11-hydroxy-6,6,9,13-tetramethyl-5,7-dioxapentacyclo[10.8.0.0^{2,9}.0^{4,8}.0^{13,18}]icosa-16,18-dien-8-yl]-2-oxoethyl acetate
- CAS Number: 2825-60-7
- PubChem CID: 17794
- DrugBank: DB13664
- ChemSpider: 254985
- UNII: 8E21R0Z4M5
- KEGG: D04244

Chemical and physical data
- Formula: C_{29}H_{38}ClFO_{8}
- Molar mass: 569.06 g·mol^{−1}
- 3D model (JSmol): Interactive image
- SMILES: CC(=O)OCC(=O)[C@@]12[C@@H](C[C@@H]3[C@@]1(C[C@@H]([C@]4([C@H]3CC(=C5[C@@]4(CCC(=C5)OCCCl)C)C=O)F)O)C)OC(O2)(C)C
- InChI: InChI=1S/C29H38ClFO8/c1-16(33)37-15-23(35)29-24(38-25(2,3)39-29)12-20-21-10-17(14-32)19-11-18(36-9-8-30)6-7-26(19,4)28(21,31)22(34)13-27(20,29)5/h11,14,20-22,24,34H,6-10,12-13,15H2,1-5H3/t20-,21-,22-,24+,26-,27-,28-,29+/m0/s1; Key:QNXUUBBKHBYRFW-QWAPGEGQSA-N

Formocortal (INN), also known as fluoroformylone, is a corticosteroid used in dermatology and ophthalmology.

It was introduced in around 1970 and is not known to be marketed as of 2021.

== See also ==
- Glucocorticoid
