= Latanoprostene bunod =

Chemical compound

Clinical data
- Trade names: Vyzulta
- Other names: BOL-303259-X
- AHFS/Drugs.com: Monograph
- License data: US DailyMed: Latanoprostene bunod
- Drug class: Prostaglandin analog
- ATC code: S01EE06 (WHO)

Legal status
- Legal status: CA: ℞-only; US: ℞-only

Identifiers
- IUPAC name: 4-Nitrooxybutyl (Z)-7-[(1R,2R,3R,5S)-3,5-dihydroxy-2-[(3R)-3-hydroxy-5-phenylpentyl]cyclopentyl]hept-5-enoate
- CAS Number: 860005-21-6
- PubChem CID: 11156438
- DrugBank: DB11660
- ChemSpider: 9331546
- UNII: I6393O0922
- KEGG: D10441
- ChEMBL: ChEMBL2364612
- CompTox Dashboard (EPA): DTXSID101027765
- ECHA InfoCard: 100.251.571

Chemical and physical data
- Formula: C_{27}H_{41}NO_{8}
- Molar mass: 507.624 g·mol^{−1}
- 3D model (JSmol): Interactive image
- SMILES: C1[C@H]([C@@H]([C@H]([C@H]1O)C/C=C\CCCC(=O)OCCCCO[N+](=O)[O-])CC[C@H](CCC2=CC=CC=C2)O)O
- InChI: InChI=1S/C27H41NO8/c29-22(15-14-21-10-4-3-5-11-21)16-17-24-23(25(30)20-26(24)31)12-6-1-2-7-13-27(32)35-18-8-9-19-36-28(33)34/h1,3-6,10-11,22-26,29-31H,2,7-9,12-20H2/b6-1-/t22-,23+,24+,25-,26+/m0/s1; Key:LOVMMUBRQUFEAH-UIEAZXIASA-N

Latanoprostene bunod, sold under the brand name Vyzulta, is an ophthalmic medication used for the reduction of intraocular pressure in people with open-angle glaucoma or ocular hypertension. It is a prostaglandin analog which, when broken down by esterases and other metabolism, produces latanoprost acid and eventually nitric oxide. Latanoprost increases uveoscleral outflow while the nitrous oxide increases outflow via the trabecular meshwork.

The most common side effects include conjunctival (eye) redness, eye irritation, and eye discomfort (pain). Latanoprostene bunod may cause the iris (colored part of the eye) to become darker in color.

Latanoprostene bunod was approved for medical use in the United States in November 2017.

== Medical uses ==
Latanoprostene bunod is indicated for the reduction of intraocular pressure in people with open-angle glaucoma or ocular hypertension.

== History ==
The US Food and Drug Administration (FDA) approved latanoprostene bunod based on evidence from two clinical trials that enrolled 840 participants with open angle glaucoma or ocular hypertension. The trials evaluated the benefits and side effects of latanoprostene bunod. In each trial, participants were randomly assigned to receive either latanoprostene bunod or an approved drug timolol (ophthalmic solution) every day for three months. Neither the participants nor the health care providers knew which treatment was being given until after the trials were completed. The trials were conducted in the United States, the United Kingdom, Germany, Italy, Bulgaria, the Czech Republic, and Japan.
