= Pranoprofen =

Non-steroidal anti-inflammatory drug

Clinical data
- AHFS/Drugs.com: International Drug Names
- Routes of administration: Oral
- ATC code: S01BC09 (WHO)

Legal status
- Legal status: In general: ℞ (Prescription only)

Identifiers
- IUPAC name: 2-(5H-chromeno[2,3-b]pyridin-7-yl)propanoic acid
- CAS Number: 52549-17-4
- PubChem CID: 4888
- ChemSpider: 4719
- UNII: 2R7O1ET613
- ChEMBL: ChEMBL367463
- CompTox Dashboard (EPA): DTXSID1023497
- ECHA InfoCard: 100.207.151

Chemical and physical data
- Formula: C_{15}H_{13}NO_{3}
- Molar mass: 255.273 g·mol^{−1}
- 3D model (JSmol): Interactive image
- SMILES: CC(C1=CC2=C(C=C1)OC3=C(C2)C=CC=N3)C(=O)O
- InChI: InChI=1S/C15H13NO3/c1-9(15(17)18)10-4-5-13-12(7-10)8-11-3-2-6-16-14(11)19-13/h2-7,9H,8H2,1H3,(H,17,18); Key:TVQZAMVBTVNYLA-UHFFFAOYSA-N

Pranoprofen (INN) is a nonsteroidal anti-inflammatory drug (NSAID) used in ophthalmology.
