= C16H18N2O7S2 =

The molecular formula C_{16}H_{18}N_{2}O_{7}S_{2} (molar mass: 414.453 g/mol) may refer to:

- Sulbenicillin
- Temocillin
