= Sulfadicramide =

Chemical compound

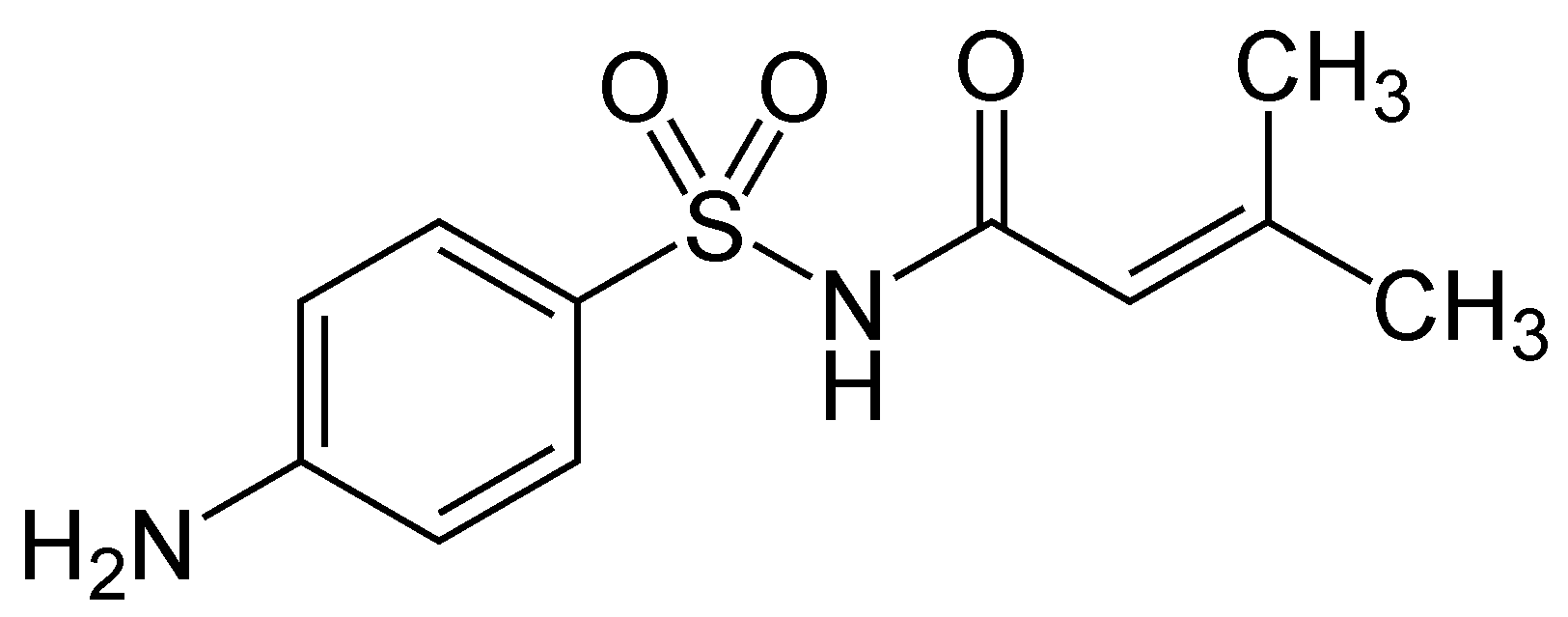

Clinical data
- ATC code: S01AB03 (WHO)

Identifiers
- IUPAC name: N-(4-aminophenyl)sulfonyl-3-methylbut-2-enamide
- CAS Number: 115-68-4
- PubChem CID: 8281
- DrugBank: DB13214
- UNII: 7WZ5EG263C
- KEGG: D07412
- ChEBI: CHEBI:135039
- ChEMBL: ChEMBL2104910
- CompTox Dashboard (EPA): DTXSID90150922
- ECHA InfoCard: 100.003.727

Chemical and physical data
- Formula: C_{11}H_{14}N_{2}O_{3}S
- Molar mass: 254.30 g·mol^{−1}
- 3D model (JSmol): Interactive image
- SMILES: CC(=CC(=O)NS(=O)(=O)C1=CC=C(C=C1)N)C
- InChI: InChI=InChI=1S/C11H14N2O3S/c1-8(2)7-11(14)13-17(15,16)10-5-3-9(12)4-6-10/h3-7H,12H2,1-2H3,(H,13,14); Key:XRVJPLDTMUSSDE-UHFFFAOYSA-N

Sulfadicramide (marketed as Irgamid) is an anti-infective.
