= QH =

QH, qh, or q.h. may refer to:

== Airlines ==
- Air Florida (former IATA airline designator QH)
- Bamboo Airways (IATA airline designator QH)
- Kyrgyzstan (airline) (IATA airline designator QH)

== Medicine ==
- ATCvet code QH Systemic hormonal preparations, excluding sex hormones and insulins, a section of the Anatomical Therapeutic Chemical Classification System for veterinary medicinal products
- q.h. or qh, Latin for "every hour" (also q2h "every 2 hours", etc.), an abbreviation used in medical prescriptions

== Other uses ==
- Qinghai, a province of China (Guobiao abbreviation QH)
