= Micronomicin =

Chemical compound

Clinical data
- Other names: (2R,3R,4R,5R)-2-[(1S,2S,4S,6R)-4,6-diamino-3-[(2R,3R,6S)-3-amino-6-(methylaminomethyl)oxan-2-yl]oxy-2-hydroxycyclohexyl]oxy-5-methyl-4-methylaminooxane-3,5-diol
- AHFS/Drugs.com: International Drug Names
- Routes of administration: Eye drops, IV
- ATC code: S01AA22 (WHO)

Legal status
- Legal status: In general: ℞ (Prescription only)

Identifiers
- IUPAC name: (1R,2S,3S,4R,6S)-4,6-diamino-3-{[3-deoxy-4-C-methyl-3-(methylamino)-β-L-arabinopyranosyl]oxy}-2-hydroxycyclohexyl 2-amino-2,3,4,6-tetradeoxy-6-(methylamino)-α-D-erythro-hexopyranoside
- CAS Number: 52093-21-7
- PubChem CID: 107677
- ChemSpider: 2301017
- UNII: S9AZ0R40QV
- KEGG: D08219
- CompTox Dashboard (EPA): DTXSID401023736

Chemical and physical data
- Formula: C_{20}H_{41}N_{5}O_{7}
- Molar mass: 463.576 g·mol^{−1}
- 3D model (JSmol): Interactive image
- Melting point: 260 °C (500 °F) (dec.)
- SMILES: C[C@@]1(CO[C@@H]([C@@H]([C@H]1NC)O)O[C@H]2[C@@H](C[C@@H](C([C@@H]2O)O[C@@H]3[C@@H](CC[C@H](O3)CNC)N)N)N)O
- InChI: InChI=1S/C20H41N5O7/c1-20(28)8-29-19(14(27)17(20)25-3)32-16-12(23)6-11(22)15(13(16)26)31-18-10(21)5-4-9(30-18)7-24-2/h9-19,24-28H,4-8,21-23H2,1-3H3/t9-,10+,11-,12+,13-,14+,15+,16-,17+,18+,19+,20-/m0/s1; Key:DNYGXMICFMACRA-XHEDQWPISA-N

Micronomicin (INN) is an aminoglycoside antibiotic for use on the eye.
