= Pirenoxine =

Chemical compound

Clinical data
- Trade names: Catalin
- ATCvet code: QS01XA91 (WHO)

Identifiers
- IUPAC name: 1,5-Dioxo-4H-pyrido[3,2-a]phenoxazine-3-carboxylic acid
- CAS Number: 1043-21-6
- PubChem CID: 4846
- ChemSpider: 4846
- UNII: 27L0EP6IZK
- CompTox Dashboard (EPA): DTXSID6048335
- ECHA InfoCard: 100.012.612

Chemical and physical data
- Formula: C_{16}H_{8}N_{2}O_{5}
- Molar mass: 308.249 g·mol^{−1}
- 3D model (JSmol): Interactive image
- SMILES: C1=CC=C2C(=C1)N=C3C(=CC(=O)C4=C3C(=O)C=C(N4)C(=O)O)O2
- InChI: InChI=1S/C16H8N2O5/c19-9-5-8(16(21)22)18-14-10(20)6-12-15(13(9)14)17-7-3-1-2-4-11(7)23-12/h1-6H,(H,18,19)(H,21,22); Key:OKPNYGAWTYOBFZ-UHFFFAOYSA-N

Pirenoxine (abbreviated PRX, trade name Catalin) is a medication used in the possible treatment and prevention of cataracts.

A report in the Inorganic Chemistry journal showed that in liquid solutions, pirenoxine could cause decreased cloudiness of a crystallin solution produced to mimic the environment of the eye. Pirenoxine interacts with selenite or calcium ions that have been proven as factors leading to the formation of lens cataract.

Pirenoxine reduces the cloudiness of the lens solution, containing calcium by 38% and reducing the cloudiness of the selenite solution by 11%.

“...there are not any proctored studies that prove the utility of these drops. In Canada and in the U.S. they are considered homeopathic—where they probably do no harm but doubtful that they will have any protective value."
