= Chloroprednisone =

Topical glucocorticoid drug

Clinical data
- Other names: 6α-Chloro-1,4-pregnadiene-17a,21-diol-3,11,20-trione
- ATC code: S01CA09 (WHO) (combination with antiinfectives)

Identifiers
- IUPAC name: (6α)-6-Chloro-17,21-dihydroxypregna-1,4-diene-3,11,20-trione
- CAS Number: 52080-57-6
- PubChem CID: 3034026
- ChemSpider: 2298578
- UNII: 564IBO56IP
- ECHA InfoCard: 100.052.387

Chemical and physical data
- Formula: C_{21}H_{25}ClO_{5}
- Molar mass: 392.88 g·mol^{−1}
- 3D model (JSmol): Interactive image
- SMILES: O=C(CO)[C@@]3(O)CC[C@H]2[C@@H]4C[C@H](Cl)\C1=C\C(=O)\C=C/[C@]1(C)[C@H]4C(=O)C[C@@]23C
- InChI: InChI=1S/C21H25ClO5/c1-19-5-3-11(24)7-14(19)15(22)8-12-13-4-6-21(27,17(26)10-23)20(13,2)9-16(25)18(12)19/h3,5,7,12-13,15,18,23,27H,4,6,8-10H2,1-2H3/t12-,13-,15-,18+,19-,20-,21-/m0/s1; Key:NPSLCOWKFFNQKK-ZPSUVKRCSA-N

Chloroprednisone is a topical glucocorticoid first reported in 1960. It is a chlorinated derivative of prednisone. The acetate ester prodrug, chloroprednisone 21-acetate, was sold under the brand name Topilan as an anti-inflammatory agent.

There is little published about chloroprednisone. This may be due to limited activity topically because the skin lacks the necessary activating enzyme 11β-Hydroxysteroid dehydrogenase. Systemically, this agent's activity on glucocorticoid receptors may not have competed with agents like fludrocortisone or dexamethasone.
