= Cloprednol =

Chemical compound

Clinical data
- AHFS/Drugs.com: International Drug Names
- ATC code: H02AB14 (WHO)

Identifiers
- IUPAC name: (9S,10R,11S,13S,14S,17R)-6-chloro-11,17-dihydroxy-17-(2-hydroxyacetyl)-10,13-dimethyl-9,11,12,14,15,16-hexahydro-8H-cyclopenta[a]phenanthren-3-one
- CAS Number: 5251-34-3
- PubChem CID: 10023463
- ChemSpider: 4447592
- UNII: SYP56O3GJG
- KEGG: D03561
- ChEMBL: ChEMBL1697832
- CompTox Dashboard (EPA): DTXSID1022849
- ECHA InfoCard: 100.023.684

Chemical and physical data
- Formula: C_{21}H_{25}ClO_{5}
- Molar mass: 392.88 g·mol^{−1}
- 3D model (JSmol): Interactive image
- SMILES: O=C\1\C=C/[C@]4(C(=C/1)C(\Cl)=C/[C@@H]2[C@@H]4[C@@H](O)C[C@@]3([C@@](O)(C(=O)CO)CC[C@@H]23)C)C

Cloprednol is a synthetic glucocorticoid. It has been investigated for use in asthma.
