= Fluoromedroxyprogesterone acetate =

Chemical compound

Clinical data
- Other names: FMPA; 9α-Fluoromedroxyprogesterone acetate; 9α-FMPA; 9α-Fluoro-6α-methyl-17α-hydroxyprogesterone acetate; 17α-Acetoxy-9α-fluoro-6α-methylpregn-4-ene-3,20-dione; 9α-Fluoro-6α-methyl-3,20-dioxopregn-4-en-17-yl acetate
- Routes of administration: By mouth
- Drug class: Angiogenesis inhibitor; Progestogen; Progestogen ester; Progestin; Glucocorticoid

Identifiers
- IUPAC name: [(6S,8S,9R,10S,13S,14S,17R)-17-Acetyl-9-fluoro-6,10,13-trimethyl-3-oxo-1,2,6,7,8,11,12,14,15,16-decahydrocyclopenta[a]phenanthren-17-yl] acetate
- CAS Number: 171611-77-1
- PubChem CID: 9865941
- ChemSpider: 8041632
- UNII: 8Q7RBX3VSU

Chemical and physical data
- Formula: C_{24}H_{33}FO_{4}
- Molar mass: 404.522 g·mol^{−1}
- 3D model (JSmol): Interactive image
- SMILES: C[C@H]1C[C@H]2[C@@H]3CC[C@@]([C@]3(CC[C@@]2([C@@]4(C1=CC(=O)CC4)C)F)C)(C(=O)C)OC(=O)C
- InChI: InChI=1S/C24H33FO4/c1-14-12-20-18-7-9-24(15(2)26,29-16(3)27)22(18,5)10-11-23(20,25)21(4)8-6-17(28)13-19(14)21/h13-14,18,20H,6-12H2,1-5H3/t14-,18-,20-,21-,22-,23+,24-/m0/s1; Key:OITYTGLRWMEVSQ-XDBMOVBSSA-N

Fluoromedroxyprogesterone acetate (FMPA, 9α-fluoromedroxyprogesterone acetate, or 9α-FMPA) is a synthetic steroid medication which was under development by Meiji Dairies Corporation in the 1990s and 2000s for the potential treatment of cancers but was never marketed. It is described as an antiangiogenic agent, with about two orders of magnitude greater potency for inhibition of angiogenesis than its parent compound medroxyprogesterone acetate. FMPA showed about the same affinities for the progesterone and glucocorticoid receptors as MPA. It reached the preclinical phase of research prior to the discontinuation of its development.

== See also ==
- Anecortave acetate
