= Sulbenicillin =

Chemical compound

Clinical data
- AHFS/Drugs.com: International Drug Names
- ATC code: J01CA16 (WHO)

Identifiers
- IUPAC name: (2S,5R,6R)-3,3-dimethyl-7-oxo-6-[(2-phenyl-2-sulfoacetyl)amino]-4-thia-1-azabicyclo[3.2.0]heptane-2-carboxylic acid
- CAS Number: 41744-40-5 28002-18-8
- PubChem CID: 39031
- ChemSpider: 16736045
- UNII: Q2VYF0562D
- KEGG: D08534
- ChEMBL: ChEMBL564107
- CompTox Dashboard (EPA): DTXSID20873379 DTXSID90873381, DTXSID20873379
- ECHA InfoCard: 100.050.462

Chemical and physical data
- Formula: C_{16}H_{18}N_{2}O_{7}S_{2}
- Molar mass: 414.45 g·mol^{−1}
- 3D model (JSmol): Interactive image
- SMILES: CC1([C@@H](N2[C@H](S1)[C@@H](C2=O)NC(=O)[C@@H](c3ccccc3)S(=O)(=O)O)C(=O)O)C
- InChI: InChI=1S/C16H18N2O7S2/c1-16(2)11(15(21)22)18-13(20)9(14(18)26-16)17-12(19)10(27(23,24)25)8-6-4-3-5-7-8/h3-7,9-11,14H,1-2H3,(H,17,19)(H,21,22)(H,23,24,25)/t9-,10-,11+,14-/m1/s1; Key:JETQIUPBHQNHNZ-NJBDSQKTSA-N

Sulbenicillin (INN) is a penicillin antibiotic. It has been used in combination with dibekacin.
