= Amphenicol =

Class of antibiotics

Chloramphenicol

Thiamphenicol

Amphenicols are a class of antibiotics with a phenylpropanoid structure. They function by blocking the enzyme peptidyl transferase on the 50S ribosome subunit of bacteria.

Examples of amphenicols include chloramphenicol, thiamphenicol, azidamfenicol, and florfenicol. The first-in-class compound was chloramphenicol, introduced in 1949. Chloramphenicol was initially discovered as a natural product and isolated from the soil bacteria Streptomyces venezuelae; however, all amphenicols are now made by chemical synthesis.
