= Topical anesthetic =

Agent that numbs a body surface

A topical anesthetic is a local anesthetic that is used to numb the surface of a body part. They can be used to numb any area of the skin as well as the front of the eyeball, the inside of the nose, ear or throat, the anus and the genital area. Topical anesthetics are available in creams, ointments, aerosols, sprays, lotions, and jellies. Examples include benzocaine, butamben, dibucaine, lidocaine, oxybuprocaine, pramoxine, proxymetacaine (proparacaine), and tetracaine (also named amethocaine).

== Usage ==
Topical anesthetics are used to relieve pain and itching caused by conditions such as sunburn or other minor burns, insect bites or stings, poison ivy, poison oak, poison sumac, and minor cuts and scratches.

Topical anesthetics are used in ophthalmology and optometry to numb the surface of the eye (the outermost layers of the cornea and conjunctiva) to:

- Perform a contact/applanation tonometry.
- Perform a Schirmer's test (The Schirmer's test is sometimes used with a topical eye anesthetic, sometimes without. The use of a topical anesthetic might impede the reliability of the Schirmer's test and should be avoided if possible.).
- Remove small foreign objects from the uppermost layer of the cornea or conjunctiva. The deeper and the larger a foreign object which should be removed lies within the cornea and the more complicated it is to remove it, the more drops of topical anesthetic are necessary prior to the removal of the foreign object to numb the surface of the eye with enough intensity and duration.

In dentistry, topical anesthetics are used to numb oral tissue before administering a dental local anesthetic due to the entry of the needle into the soft tissues of the oral cavity. Dental anesthetic gels are sometimes flavored to make usage more tolerable for patients, especially in pediatric dentistry.

Some topical anesthetics (e.g. oxybuprocaine) are also used in otolaryngology.

Topical anesthetics are sometimes abused for temporary relief of premature ejaculation when applied to the glans (head) of the penis. Benzocaine or lidocaine are typically used for this purpose as they are available as over-the-counter drugs.

== Abuse when used for ocular pain relief ==
When used excessively, topical anesthetics can cause severe and irreversible damage to corneal tissues and even loss of the eye. The abuse of topical anesthetics often creates challenges for correct diagnosis in that it is a relatively uncommon entity that may initially present as a chronic keratitis, masquerading as acanthamoeba keratitis or other infectious keratitis. When a keratitis is unresponsive to treatment and associated with strong ocular pain, topical anesthetic abuse should be considered, and a history of psychiatric disorders and other substance abuse have been implicated as important factors in the diagnosis. Because of the potential for abuse, clinicians have been warned about the possibility of theft and advised against prescribing topical anesthetics for therapeutic purposes.

Some patients who have eye pain, which is often considerably strong neuropathic pain caused by the irritation of the nerves within the cornea and/or conjunctiva, try to illegally obtain oxybuprocaine or other eye anesthetics (for example by stealing them at their ophthalmologist or optometrist, by forging medical prescriptions or by trying to order it via an online pharmacy) and use the substance to numb their eye pain, often ending up with irreversible corneal damage or even destruction (which is a vicious cycle and causes more pain). Often, such patients finally require corneal transplantation.

In case of prolonged or chronic eye pain, especially neuropathic eye pain, it is highly advisable to use centrally acting substances like anticonvulsants (pregabalin, gabapentin and in more serious cases carbamazepine) or antidepressants (for example SSRIs or the tricyclic antidepressant amitriptyline). Even very small amounts of an anticonvulsant and/or an antidepressant can almost completely stop eye pain and does not damage the eye at all.

== See also ==
- Local anesthesia
- Topical
