= European Pharmaceutical Market Research Association =

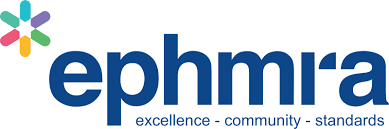
- Logo of EPHMRA used since 1961
- Industry: Non-profit pharmaceutical market research organisation
- Founded: 5 April 1961
- Services: Code of Conduct and Guidelines; Publications and Reports; Regulatory Affairs and Compliance; Working Groups and Committees
- Members: Over 200 pharmaceutical companies
- Website: https://www.ephmra.org/

European Pharmaceutical Market Research Association (EPHMRA) is a European pharmaceutical market research association established in 1961. EPHMRA aimed to provide the best methods of market research and share it with the global community. It also aimed to improve the public’s general healthcare, by doing market research which then ensures the quality and safety of marketed pharmaceutical products. To ensure the research done is according to the ethical standard, EPHMRA developed the Code of Conduct and formulated the Ethics Committee.

Internally, EPHMRA provided activities including training, and conferences to members regularly, aiming to enhance the professional development of the members and bring insights into the pharmaceutical market research field. Externally, EPHMRA collaborates with other organizations, for example, the European Network of Research Ethics, and the European Federation of Pharmaceutical Industries and Associations (EFPIA) aiming to improve the pharmaceutical market research methods, which could further enhance the overall safety of consumers.

== History ==
Due to the need for comparable and reliable information related to pharmaceutical product research and marketing in the 1960s, various European companies sent their representatives to meet in Geneva on 5 May 1961. This meeting cause the foundation of the European Pharmaceutical Market Research Association (EPHMRA), carrying the aim to search for the best possible market research method and share it with the community.

Across the decades, EPHMRA has grown into a leading authority on pharmaceutical market research, developing best practices and guidelines for the industry and providing a range of services to its members. Pharmaceutical companies, market research agencies, and other organizations involved in the pharmaceutical industry are all included in the membership of EPHMRA.

Today, the organization continues to have a significant impact on the future of pharmaceutical market research in Europe, providing a platform for industry professionals to discuss, network, and collaborate.

== Membership ==
The European Pharmaceutical Market Research Association (EPHMRA) has a diverse membership that includes pharmaceutical companies, market research agencies, and other organizations involved in the pharmaceutical industry. Members come from a range of countries throughout Europe and beyond,

=== Composition ===
Pharmaceutical companies make up a significant portion of EPHMRA's membership, as these companies are the primary users of market research data. They include both large multinational corporations and smaller, specialized firms. Market research agencies are also well-represented among EPHMRA's membership, as they are the primary providers of market research services to the pharmaceutical industry. Other organizations that may be members of EPHMRA include consulting firms, data providers, and academic institutions.

=== Criteria ===
To become a member organisation of EPHMRA, an organization must meet the association's eligibility criteria and adhere to its Code of Conduct. Members responsible to contribute to the association's mission of promoting the highest standards of market research in the pharmaceutical industry. In return, EPHMRA offers various services to its members, including training, networking opportunities, and access to industry data and insights.

== Activities ==
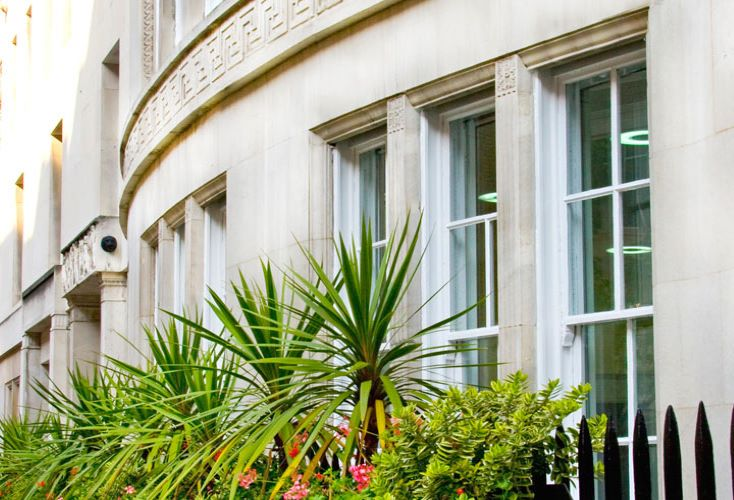
The annual conference 2023 is going to be located at Hallam Conference Center, 44 Hallam Street, London, W1W 6JJ.

=== Conferences ===
The European Pharmaceutical Market Research Association (EPHMRA) organises conferences every year, which allow participants to share about the latest information in the pharmaceutical market research. For examples, the 2023 annual conference would be held during the 27–29 June in the Hallam Conference Centre, where both a main session and a breakout room session would be held to enhance participants engagement.

=== Market researches ===
EPHMRA do market researches regularly, aiming to investigate on the latest development in the pharmaceutical market research to the public, and to advocate pharmaceutical market research policies to the government. Recently, research topics related to digital health, patient engagement and GDPR compliance have been investigated. Moreover, EPHMRA would formulates a Global Market Research Report every year, which give insights on the market research methods used in different countries.

=== Training ===
Training programs were designed with an aim to providing members with up-to-date skills and resources needed in pharmaceutical market research. Both online and face-to-face training are offered, covering topics including data privacy, regulatory compliance, and ethics. EPHMRA also collaborated with other organizations, for example, the Pharmaceutical Market Research Group to offer a joint certification program. This is a type of program that give credits to individual with high performance, letting them better compete in the job market.

=== Awards ===
Awards were given to members to recognize their contributions to the pharmaceutical market research industry. The types of awards includes:

1. The EPHMRA President’s Award for Contribution to Healthcare Market Research – an award started in 2001
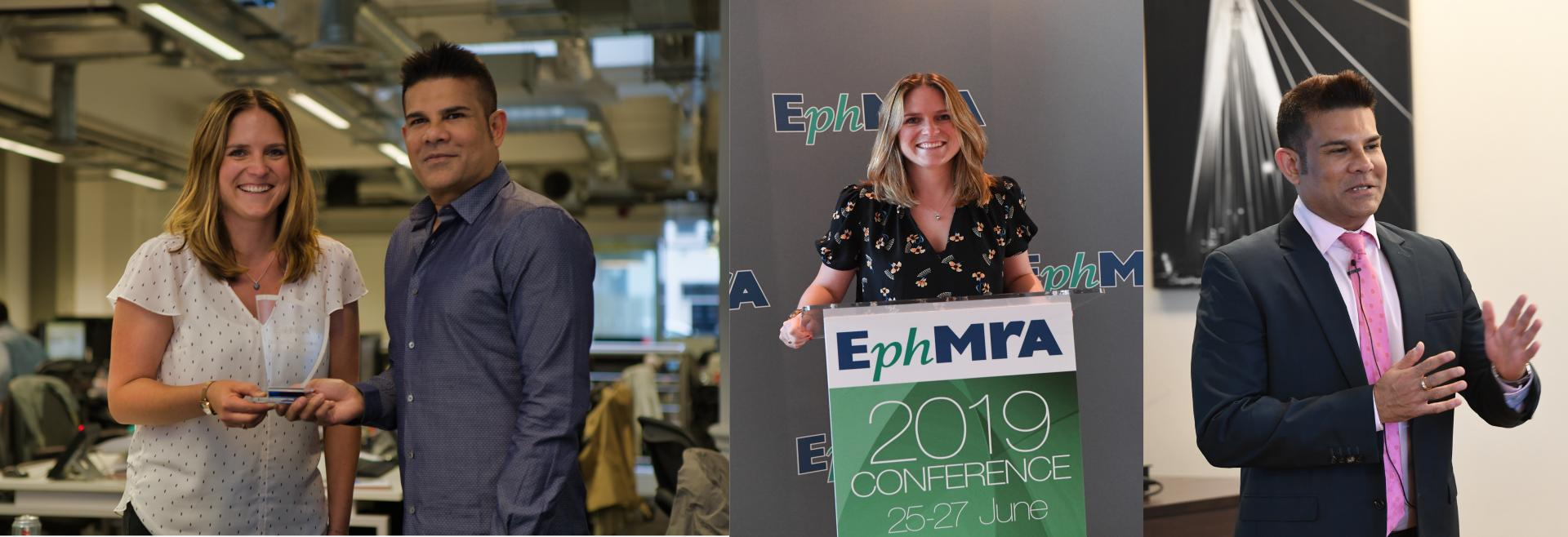
  Georgina Cooper & Soumya Roy from Basis Health, the winners of the Jack Hayhurst Award in 2019
  during the Athens Conference
2. The Jack Hayhurst Award – an award given to the writer of the best paper during the conferences, by voting of participants
3. The MR Excellence Award – an award presented to members, by criteria of business insight, leadership, and innovation
4. The Young Professional Conference Grants

== Management ==
=== Board of Directors ===
The European Pharmaceutical Market Research Association (EPHMRA) is led by a board of directors. The board is responsible to give direction to the organization’s future objectives and to ensure that EPHMRA fulfills its goal in market research effectively.

Members of the board for 2022-2023 are as follows:

Title	Name
President	Karsten Trautmann
Past president and/or Vice President	Thomas Hein
Treasurer	Charles Tissier
General Manager	Bernadette Rogers
Board agency members	Amr Khalil, Ana Maria Aguirre Arteta, Carolyn Chamberlain, Marcel Slavenburg, Richard Head, Stephen Potts
Board Industry members	Sander Rajimakers, Vijay Chand, Paul warner

=== Committees ===
EPHMRA has committees including the Classification Committee, New Form Code Committee, Data and Science Committee and Ethics Committee. The committees serve to work as different functions, including to formulate the Code of Conduct, the New Form Code System and other pharmaceutical classification system, and to maintain the ethical standard in research.

==== Classification Committee ====
The Classification Committee is responsible to develop and update the Anatomical Classification System and the Therapeutic Classification System. The classification system is used to provide a standardized framework in categorizing pharmaceutical products based on their anatomical and therapeutical categories, which then enables researchers compare the data among different pharmaceutical products effectively during market researches.

==== New Form Codes Committee ====
The New Form Codes Committee is responsible to develop and update the New Form Code system, which is a system used to classify pharmaceutical products according to their dosage forms, allowing researchers to effectively compare different pharmaceutical products during market researches.

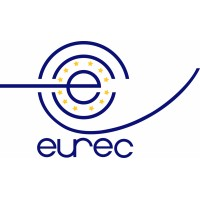
European Network of Research Ethics Committees, which works with the Ethics Committee in EPHMRA

==== Data and Science Committee ====
The Data and Science Committee is responsible to advocate the use of innovative data analysis. To achieve this, the Committee has to be aware of emerging trends and technologies in data analysis and see if the new technologies could be applied in pharmaceutical market research. Moreover, the committee is responsible to provide data analysis trainings to members.

==== Ethics Committee ====
The Ethics Committee aims to promote ethical standards in pharmaceutical market research. The Committee is responsible to update the Code of Conduct, which is guides the ethical consideration in market research. The committee also works with the European Network of Research Ethics, which is a network of European ethical organisation, to discuss new ways to promote research ethics.

== Controversies ==
There are complaints that The European Pharmaceutical Market Research Association (EPHMRA)’s Anatomical Classification System is not accurate enough, since it over-simplifies certain therapeutic conditions. Moreover, there are concerns about privacy during data collection and analysis in the market research carried out by the organization. It is therefore argued that there may be a need to supervise the EPHMRA to ensure its research are transparent and follows ethical standard and to prevent potential conflict of interest from occur. In response to this, EPHMRA developed and enforced the Code of Conduct to set up ethical guidelines and work with other ethical bodies to ensure their market goes by ethical standard
