= Desacetylmetipranolol =

Names
- Preferred IUPAC name 4-{2-Hydroxy-3-[(propan-2-yl)amino]propoxy}-2,3,6-trimethylphenol
- Other names Deacetylmetipranolol; Deacetyltrimepranol; Desacetylmetipranolol

Identifiers
CAS Number	57193-14-3
3D model (JSmol)	Interactive image
ChEMBL	ChEMBL1201363
ChemSpider	142935
PubChem CID	162812
UNII	5GA6I7V01M
CompTox Dashboard (EPA)	DTXSID30972645
- InChI: InChI=1S/C15H25NO3/c1-9(2)16-7-13(17)8-19-14-6-10(3)15(18)12(5)11(14)4/h6,9,13,16-18H,7-8H2,1-5H3 Key: HHMMIZFWFLNZEU-UHFFFAOYSA-N
- SMILES: O(c1c(c(c(O)c(c1)C)C)C)CC(O)CNC(C)C

Properties
Chemical formula	C_{15}H_{25}NO_{3}
Molar mass	267.369 g·mol^{−1}
- Except where otherwise noted, data are given for materials in their standard state (at 25 °C [77 °F], 100 kPa). Infobox references

Desacetylmetipranolol is the active metabolite of metipranolol.
