= ATC code H =

ATC code H Systemic hormonal preparations, excluding sex hormones and insulins is a section of the Anatomical Therapeutic Chemical Classification System, a system of alphanumeric codes developed by the World Health Organization (WHO) for the classification of drugs and other medical products.

Codes for veterinary use (ATCvet codes) can be created by placing the letter Q in front of the human ATC code: for example, QH.
National issues of the ATC classification may include additional codes not present in this list, which follows the WHO version.

== See also ==
- Sex hormones are in the ATC group G03.
- Insulins are in the ATC group A10A.
