= Eye drop =

Liquid applied directly to the eye

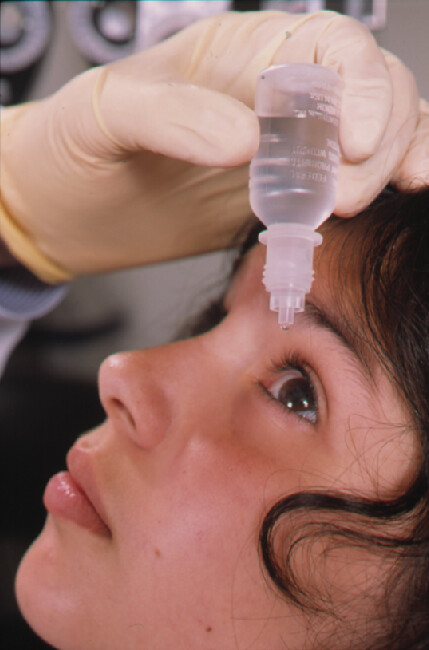
Eye drops being applied

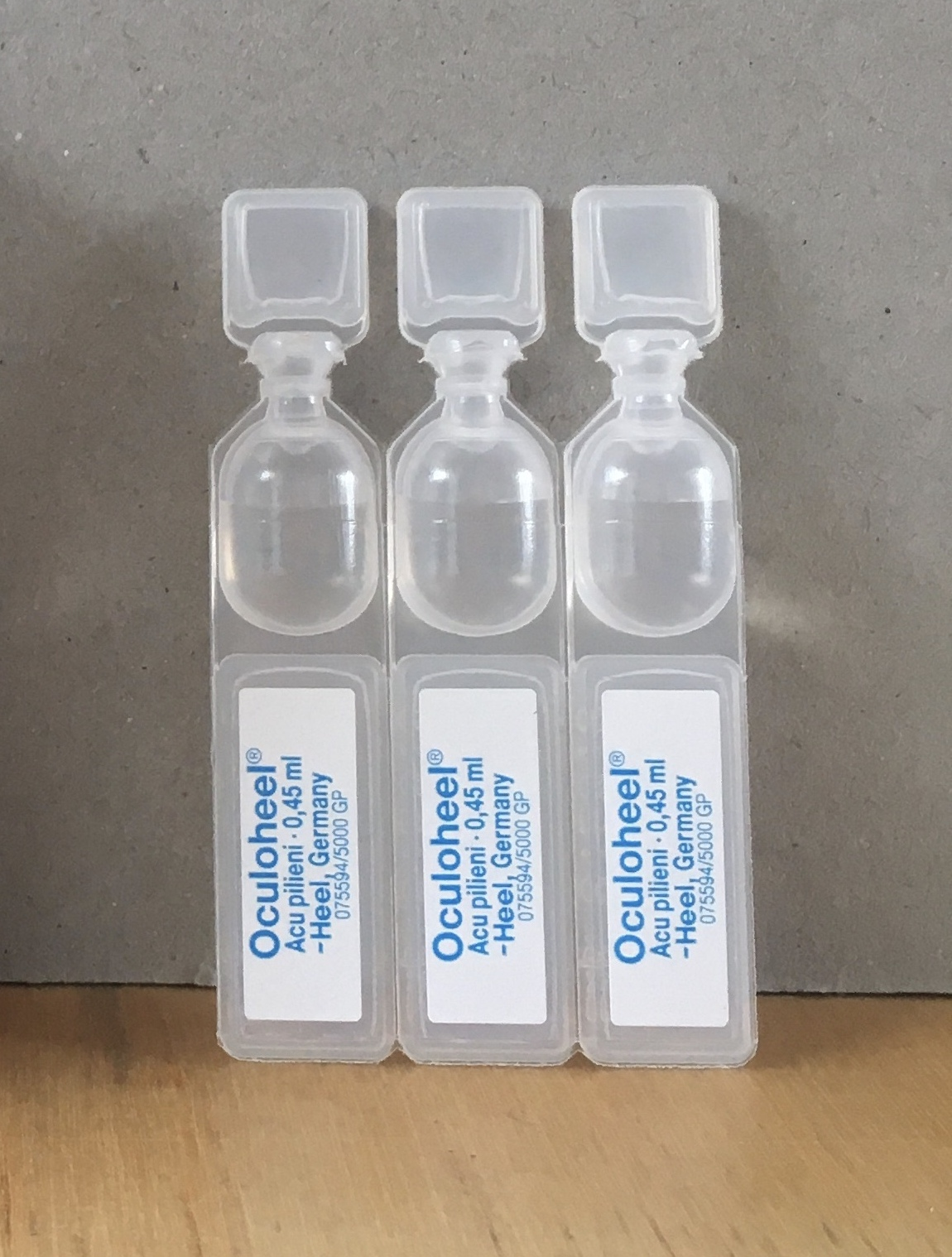
Eye drops packaged for single use, without preservatives

Eye drops or eyedrops are liquid drops applied directly to the surface of the eye usually in small amounts such as a single drop or a few drops. Eye drops usually contain saline to match the salinity of the eye. Drops containing only saline and sometimes a lubricant are often used as artificial tears to treat dry eyes or simple eye irritation such as itching or redness. Eye drops may also contain one or more medications to treat a wide variety of eye diseases. Depending on the condition being treated, they may contain steroids, antihistamines, sympathomimetics, beta receptor blockers, parasympathomimetics, parasympatholytics, prostaglandins, nonsteroidal anti-inflammatory drugs (NSAIDs), antibiotics, antifungals, or topical anesthetics.

Eye drops have less of a risk of side effects than do oral medicines, and such risk can be minimized by occluding the lacrimal punctum (i.e. pressing on the inner corner of the eye) for a short while after instilling drops.

Prior to the development of single-use pre-loaded sterile plastic applicators, eye drops were administered using an eye dropper, a glass pipette with a rubber bulb.

== Shelf life ==
Although most bottles of eye drops contain preservatives to inhibit contamination once opened, these will not prevent contamination indefinitely. Ophthalmologists recommend keeping bottles for no longer than three months after opening. Eye drops that contain no preservatives are usually packaged in single-use tubes. Dispensers typically oversize the drops; the human eye can only handle about 25 microlitres.

== Types and uses ==
Different pharmacological classes of eye drops can be recognized by patients by their different colored tops. For instance, the tops to dilating drops are a different color than anti-allergy drops.

=== Dry eyes ===
Eyes drops sometimes do not have medications in them and are only lubricating and tear-replacing solutions. There is a wide variety of artificial tear eye drops that provide different surface healing strategies. One can find bicarbonate ions, hypotonicity, high viscosity gels and ointments, and non-preserved types. They all act differently and therefore, one may have to try different artificial tears to find the one that works the best.

=== Steroid and antibiotic eye drops ===
Steroid and antibiotic eye drops are used to treat eye infections. They also have prophylactic properties and are used to prevent infections after eye surgeries. They should be used for the entire time prescribed without interruptions. The infection may relapse if the use of the medication is stopped.

=== Pink eye ===
Antibiotic eye drops are prescribed when infection conjunctivitis is caused by bacteria but not when it is caused by a virus. In the case of allergic conjunctivitis, artificial tears can help dilute irritating allergens present in the tear film.

=== Allergies ===
Some eye drops may contain histamine antagonists or nonsteroidal anti-inflammatory drug (NSAIDs), which suppress the optical mast cell responses to allergens including (but not limited to) aerosolized dust particles.

=== Glaucoma ===
Eye drops used in managing glaucoma help the eye's fluid to drain better and decrease the amount of fluid made by the eye which decreases eye pressure. They are classified by their active ingredient and they include: prostaglandin analogs, beta blockers, alpha agonists, and carbonic anhydrase inhibitors. There are also combination drugs available for those patients who require more than one type of medication.

=== Mydriatic eye drops ===
These make the eye's pupil widen to maximum, to let an optometrist have the best view inside the eyeball behind the iris. Afterwards in sunny weather they can cause dazzling and photophobia until the effect of the mydriatic has worn off.

In some countries including Russia and Italy, Tropicamide, a mydriatic eye drop, is used to some degree as an inexpensive recreational drug. Like other anticholinergics, when taken recreationally, tropicamide acts as a deliriant. When injected intravenously, as is most often the case, the tropicamide may cause problems such as slurred speech, unconsciousness, unresponsiveness, hallucinations, kidney pain, dysphoria, hyperthermia, tremors, suicidal tendency, convulsions, psychomotor agitation, tachycardia and headache.

== Injectable medication ==
Syringe designed saline drops (e.g. Wallace Cameron Ultra Saline Minipod) are distributed in modern needle-exchange programmes as they can be used efficiently either by injection or ophthalmic (if the drug is potent in small doses) route of administer which is compared to intravenous use; by demonstration, the elimination of latanoprost acid from plasma is rapid (half-life 17 minutes) after either ophthalmic or intravenous administration.

== Side effects ==
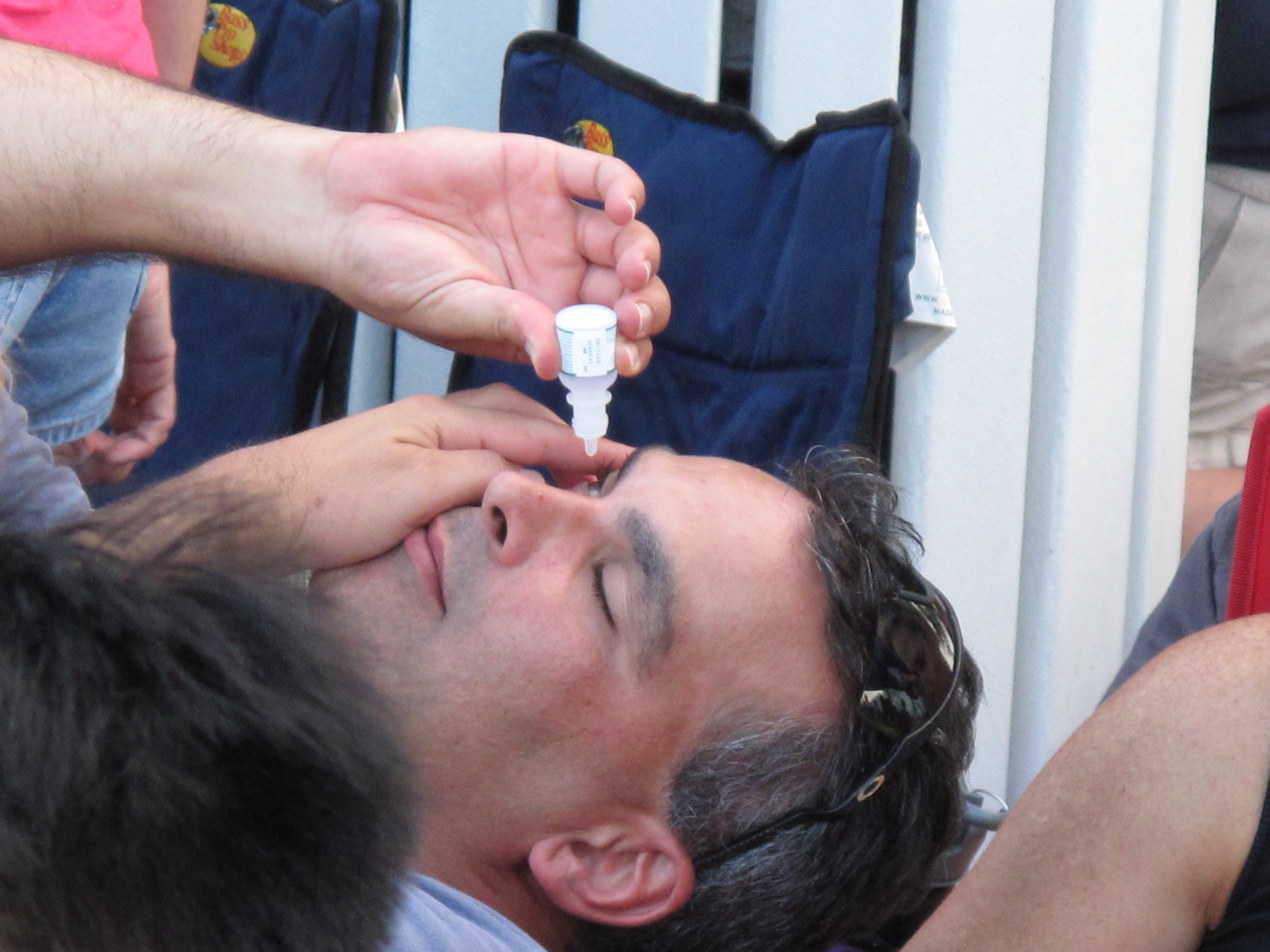
Man applying eye drops

Steroid and antibiotic eye drops may cause stinging for one or two minutes when first used and if stinging continues, medical advice should be sought. Also, one should tell their doctor if vision changes occur or if they experience persistent sore throat, fever, easy bleeding or bruising when using drops with chloramphenicol. Also, one should be aware of symptoms of an allergic reaction, such as: rash, itching, swelling, dizziness, and trouble breathing. Long term steroid use can cause many adverse effects including steroid-induced glaucoma and cataract.

Prostaglandin analogs may cause changes in iris color and eyelid skin, growth of eyelashes, stinging, blurred vision, eye redness, itching, and burning. Beta blockers' side effects include low blood pressure, reduced pulse rate, fatigue, shortness of breath, and in rare occasions, reduced libido and depression. Alpha agonists can cause burning or stinging, fatigue, headache, drowsiness, dry mouth and nose, and also they have a higher likelihood of allergic reaction. Carbonic anhydrase inhibitors may cause stinging, burning, and eye discomfort.

Lubricant eye drops may cause some side effects and one should consult a doctor if pain in the eye or changes in vision occur. Furthermore, when redness occurs but lasts more than 3 days, one should immediately consult a doctor.

== See also ==
- Artificial tears
- Carboxymethyl cellulose
- Mydriasis
- Refractive error
- Tetrahydrozoline hydrochloride
- Visine
