= Anatomical Therapeutic Chemical Classification System =

Drug classification system

The Anatomical Therapeutic Chemical (ATC) Classification System is a drug classification system that classifies the active ingredients of drugs according to the organ or system on which they act and their therapeutic, pharmacological and chemical properties. Its purpose is an aid to monitor drug use and for research to improve quality medication use. It does not imply drug recommendation or efficacy. It is controlled by the World Health Organization Collaborating Centre for Drug Statistics Methodology (WHOCC), and was first published in 1976.

== Coding system ==
This pharmaceutical coding system divides drugs into different groups according to the organ or system on which they act, their therapeutic intent or nature, and the drug's chemical characteristics. Different brands share the same code if they have the same active substance and indications. Each bottom-level ATC code stands for a pharmaceutically used substance, or a combination of substances, in a single indication (or use). This means that one drug can have more than one code, for example acetylsalicylic acid (aspirin) has A01AD05 (WHO) as a drug for local oral treatment, B01AC06 (WHO) as a platelet inhibitor, and N02BA01 (WHO) as an analgesic and antipyretic; as well as one code can represent more than one active ingredient, for example C09BB04 (WHO) is the combination of perindopril with amlodipine, two active ingredients that have their own codes (C09AA04 (WHO) and C08CA01 (WHO) respectively) when prescribed alone.

The ATC classification system is a strict hierarchy, meaning that each code necessarily has one and only one parent code, except for the 14 codes at the topmost level which have no parents. The codes are semantic identifiers, meaning they depict information by themselves beyond serving as identifiers (namely, the codes depict themselves the complete lineage of parenthood). As of 7 May 2020, there are 6,331 codes in ATC; the table below gives the count per level.

ATC level	Codes	Different names/pharmaceuticals
Level 1	14	14
Level 2	94	94
Level 3	267	262
Level 4	889	819
Level 5	5067	4363

== History ==
The ATC system is based on the earlier Anatomical Classification System, which is intended as a tool for the pharmaceutical industry to classify pharmaceutical products (as opposed to their active ingredients). This system, confusingly also called ATC, was initiated in 1971 by the European Pharmaceutical Market Research Association (EphMRA) and is being maintained by the EphMRA and Intellus. Its codes are organised into four levels. The WHO's system, having five levels, is an extension and modification of the EphMRA's. It was first published in 1976.

== Classification ==
In this system, drugs are classified into groups at five different levels:

=== First level ===
The first level of the code indicates the anatomical main group and consists of one letter. There are 14 main groups:

Code	Contents
A	Alimentary tract and metabolism
B	Blood and blood forming organs
C	Cardiovascular system
D	Dermatologicals
G	Genito-urinary system and sex hormones
H	Systemic hormonal preparations, excluding sex hormones and insulins
J	Antiinfectives for systemic use
L	Antineoplastic and immunomodulating agents
M	Musculo-skeletal system
N	Nervous system
P	Antiparasitic products, insecticides and repellents
R	Respiratory system
S	Sensory organs
V	Various

Example: C Cardiovascular system

=== Second level ===
The second level of the code indicates the therapeutic subgroup and consists of two digits.

Example: C03 Diuretics

=== Third level ===
The third level of the code indicates the therapeutic/pharmacological subgroup and consists of one letter.

Example: C03C High-ceiling diuretics

=== Fourth level ===
The fourth level of the code indicates the chemical/therapeutic/pharmacological subgroup and consists of one letter.

Example: C03CA Sulfonamides

=== Fifth level ===
The fifth level of the code indicates the chemical substance and consists of two digits.

Example: C03CA01 furosemide

== Other ATC classification systems ==
=== ATCvet ===
The Anatomical Therapeutic Chemical Classification System for veterinary medicinal products (ATCvet) is used to classify veterinary drugs. ATCvet codes can be created by placing the letter Q in front of the ATC code of most human medications. For example, furosemide for veterinary use has the code QC03CA01.

Some codes are used exclusively for veterinary drugs, such as QI Immunologicals, QJ51 Antibacterials for intramammary use or QN05AX90 amperozide.

=== Herbal ATC (HATC) ===
The Herbal ATC system (HATC) is an ATC classification of herbal substances; it differs from the regular ATC system by using 4 digits instead of 2 at the 5th level group.

The herbal classification is not adopted by WHO. The Uppsala Monitoring Centre is responsible for the Herbal ATC classification, and it is part of the WHODrug Global portfolio available by subscription.

== Defined daily dose ==
The ATC system also includes defined daily doses (DDDs) for many drugs. This is a measurement of drug consumption based on the usual daily dose for a given drug. According to the definition, "[t]he DDD is the assumed average maintenance dose per day for a drug used for its main indication in adults."

== Adaptations and updates ==
National issues of the ATC classification, such as the German Anatomisch-therapeutisch-chemische Klassifikation mit Tagesdosen, may include additional codes and DDDs not present in the WHO version.

ATC follows guidelines in creating new codes for newly approved drugs. An application is submitted to WHO for ATC classification and DDD assignment. A preliminary or temporary code is assigned and published on the website and in the WHO Drug Information for comment or objection. New ATC/DDD codes are discussed at the semi-annual Working Group meeting. If accepted it becomes a final decision and published semi-annually on the website and WHO Drug Information and implemented in the annual print/on-line ACT/DDD Index on January 1.

Changes to existing ATC/DDD follow a similar process to become temporary codes and if accepted become a final decision as ATC/DDD alterations. ATC and DDD alterations are only valid and implemented in the coming annual updates; the original codes must continue until the end of the year. An updated version of the complete on-line/print ATC index with DDDs is published annually on January 1.

== See also ==
- Classification of Pharmaco-Therapeutic Referrals (CPR)
- ICD-10 International Classification of Diseases
- International Classification of Primary Care (ICPC-2) / ICPC-2 PLUS
- Medical classification
- Pharmaceutical care
- Pharmacotherapy
- RxNorm
