= Sepetaprost =

Chemical compound

Clinical data
- Other names: STN-1012600

Legal status
- Legal status: Investigational

Identifiers
- IUPAC name: propan-2-yl 4-[(3S,5aR,6R,7R,8aS)-6-[(E,3R)-4-(2,5-difluorophenoxy)-3-hydroxybut-1-enyl]-7-hydroxy-3,4,5,5a,6,7,8,8a-octahydro-2H-cyclopenta[b]oxepin-3-yl]butanoate
- CAS Number: 1262873-06-2
- PubChem CID: 50902259
- IUPHAR/BPS: 9875
- DrugBank: DB12043
- ChemSpider: 32698273
- UNII: 79O7855J4G
- KEGG: D12617
- ChEMBL: ChEMBL4297633

Chemical and physical data
- Formula: C_{26}H_{36}F_{2}O_{6}
- Molar mass: 482.565 g·mol^{−1}
- 3D model (JSmol): Interactive image
- SMILES: CC(C)OC(=O)CCC[C@H]1CC[C@H]2[C@H](C[C@H]([C@@H]2/C=C/[C@H](COC3=C(C=CC(=C3)F)F)O)O)OC1
- InChI: InChI=1S/C26H36F2O6/c1-16(2)34-26(31)5-3-4-17-6-9-21-20(23(30)13-24(21)32-14-17)10-8-19(29)15-33-25-12-18(27)7-11-22(25)28/h7-8,10-12,16-17,19-21,23-24,29-30H,3-6,9,13-15H2,1-2H3/b10-8+/t17-,19+,20+,21+,23+,24-/m0/s1; Key:BKVUSNOUTQMSBE-XCMGCKIWSA-N

Sepetaprost is an investigational new drug that is being evaluated for the treatment of open angle glaucoma and ocular hypertension. It is an agonist of the prostaglandin EP3 and F receptors.

As of 2025 Sepetaprost is registered in Japan as Setaneo ophthalmic solution 0.002%, sold by Santen Pharmaceuticals. It is indicated for the treatment of glaucoma and ocular hypertension.
