= Plateau iris =

Anterior displacement of Iris

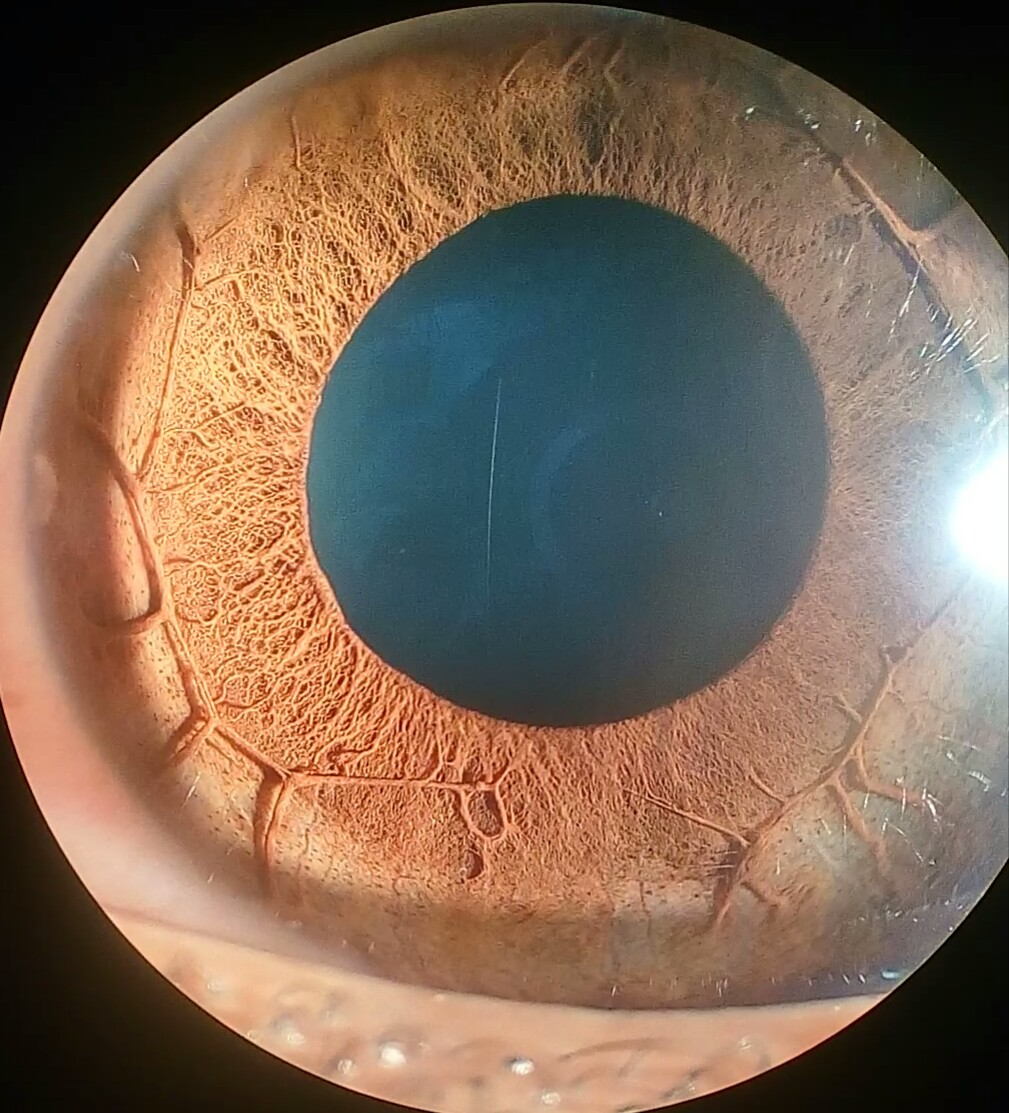
Plateau iris of a 22-year-old man

Plateau iris is a medical condition of the eye resulting from anterior displacement of the peripheral iris by the ciliary body, narrowing the drainage angle and potentially causing angle closure glaucoma. It is characterized by a flat iris in the center, but with a pronounced "curve" at the periphery, with it being more common in young, farsighted women, and may have a hereditary component.

Treatments for plateau iris include laser iridotomy, argon laser peripheral iridoplasty, drug therapy, and surgical intervention.
