= Blast injury =

Type of physical trauma

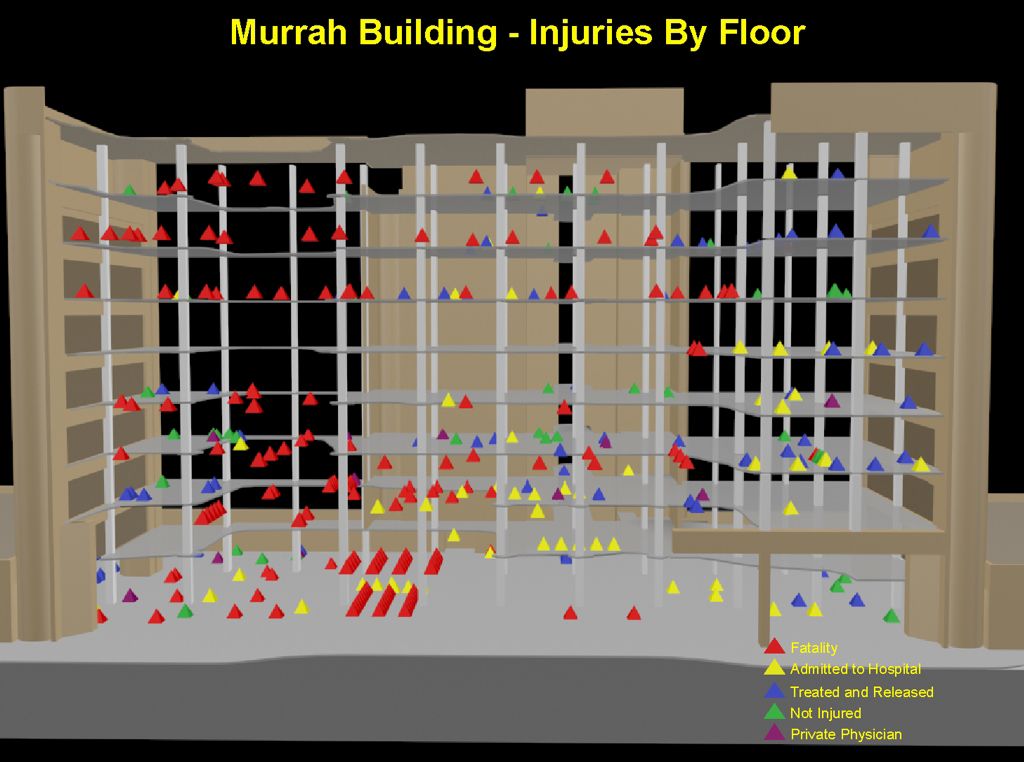
- Floor-by-floor breakdown of the injuries/deaths in the Alfred P. Murrah Federal Building from the April 1995 Oklahoma City bombing
- Specialty: Emergency medicine, trauma surgery

A blast injury is a complex type of physical trauma resulting from direct or indirect exposure to an explosion. Blast injuries occur with the detonation of high-order explosives as well as the deflagration of low order explosives. These injuries are compounded when the explosion occurs in a confined space.

== Classification ==
Diagram of a blast injury

Blast injuries are divided into four classes: primary, secondary, tertiary, and quaternary.

=== Primary injuries ===
Primary injuries are caused by blast overpressure waves, or shock waves. Total body disruption is the most severe and invariably fatal primary injury. Primary injuries are especially likely when a person is close to an exploding munition, such as a land mine. The ears are most often affected by the overpressure, followed by the lungs and the hollow organs of the gastrointestinal tract. Gastrointestinal injuries may present after a delay of hours or even days. Injury from blast overpressure is a pressure and time dependent function. By increasing the pressure or its duration, the severity of injury will also increase.

Extensive damage can also be inflicted upon the auditory system. The tympanic membrane (also known as the eardrum) may be perforated by the intensity of the pressure waves. Furthermore, the hair cells, the sound receptors found within the cochlea, can be permanently damaged and can result in a hearing loss of a mild to profound degree. Additionally, the intensity of the pressure changes from the blast can cause injury to the blood vessels and neural pathways within the auditory system. Therefore, affected individuals can have auditory processing deficits while having normal hearing thresholds. The combination of these effects can lead to hearing loss, tinnitus, headache, vertigo (dizziness), and difficulty processing sound.

In general, primary blast injuries are characterized by the absence of external injuries; thus internal injuries are frequently unrecognized and their severity underestimated. According to the latest experimental results, the extent and types of primary blast-induced injuries depend not only on the peak of the overpressure, but also other parameters such as number of overpressure peaks, time-lag between overpressure peaks, characteristics of the shear fronts between overpressure peaks, frequency resonance, and electromagnetic pulse, among others. There is general agreement that spalling, implosion, inertia, and pressure differentials are the main mechanisms involved in the pathogenesis of primary blast injuries. Thus, the majority of prior research focused on the mechanisms of blast injuries within gas-containing organs and organ systems such as the lungs, while primary blast-induced traumatic brain injury has remained underestimated. Blast lung refers to severe pulmonary contusion, bleeding or swelling with damage to alveoli and blood vessels, or a combination of these. It is the most common cause of death among people who initially survive an explosion.

=== Secondary injuries ===
Secondary injuries are ballistic trauma caused by impacts of flying shrapnels and other objects propelled by the explosion. These injuries may affect any part of the body and sometimes result in penetrating trauma with visible bleeding. At times the propelled object may become embedded in the body, obstructing the loss of blood to the outside. However, there may be extensive blood loss within the body cavities. Secondary blast wounds may be lethal and therefore many anti-personnel explosive devices are designed to generate fast-flying fragments.

Most casualties are caused by secondary injuries as shrapnels generally affect a larger area than the primary blast area, because debris can easily be propelled for hundreds or even thousands of meters. Some explosives, such as nail bombs, are deliberately designed to increase the likelihood of secondary injuries. In other instances, the target provides the raw material for the fragments thrown into surrounding, e.g., shattered glass from a blasted-out window or the glass facade of a building.

=== Tertiary injuries ===
Displacement of air by the explosion creates a blast wind that can throw victims against solid objects. Injuries resulting from this type of traumatic impact are referred to as tertiary blast injuries. Tertiary injuries may present as some combination of blunt and penetrating trauma, including bone fractures and coup contre-coup injuries. Children are at particularly high risk of tertiary injury due to their relatively smaller body weight.

=== Quaternary injuries ===
Quaternary injuries, or other miscellaneous named injuries, are all other injuries not included in the first three classes. These include flash burns, crush injuries, and respiratory injuries.

Traumatic amputations quickly result in death, unless there are available skilled medical personnel or others with adequate training nearby who are able to respond quickly, with the ability for rapid ground or air medical evacuation to an appropriate facility in time, and with tourniquets (for compression of bleeding sites) and other needed equipment (standard, or improvised; sterile, or not) also available, to treat the injuries. Because of this, injuries of this type are generally rare, though not unheard of, in survivors. Whether survivable or not, they are often accompanied by significant other injuries. The rate of eye injury may depend on the type of blast. Psychiatric injury, some of which may be caused by neurological damage incurred during the blast, is the most common quaternary injury, and post-traumatic stress disorder may affect people who are otherwise completely uninjured.

== Mechanism ==
Blast injuries can result from various types of incidents ranging from industrial accidents to deliberate attacks. High-order explosives produce a supersonic overpressure shock wave, while low order explosives deflagrate and do not produce an overpressure wave. A blast wave generated by an explosion starts with a single pulse of increased air pressure, lasting a few milliseconds. The negative pressure (suction) of the blast wave follows immediately after the positive wave. The duration of the blast wave depends on the type of explosive material and the distance from the point of detonation. The blast wave progresses from the source of explosion as a sphere of compressed and rapidly expanding gases, which displaces an equal volume of air at a very high velocity. The velocity of the blast wave in air may be extremely high, depending on the type and amount of the explosive used. An individual in the path of an explosion will be subjected not only to excess barometric pressure, but to pressure from the high-velocity wind traveling directly behind the shock front of the blast wave. The magnitude of damage due to the blast wave is dependent on the peak of the initial positive pressure wave, the duration of the overpressure, the medium in which it explodes, the distance from the incident blast wave, and the degree of focusing due to a confined area or walls. For example, explosions near or within hard solid surfaces become amplified two to nine times due to shock wave reflection. As a result, individuals between the blast and a building generally suffer two to three times the degree of injury compared to those in open spaces.

== Neurotrauma ==
Blast injuries can cause hidden sensory and brain damage, with potential neurological and neurosensory consequences. They represent a complex clinical syndrome caused by the combination of all blast effects, i.e., primary, secondary, tertiary and quaternary blast mechanisms. Blast injuries usually manifest in a form of polytrauma, i.e. injury involving multiple organs or organ systems. Bleeding from injured organs such as lungs or bowel causes a lack of oxygen in all vital organs, including the brain. Damage of the lungs reduces the surface for oxygen uptake from the air, reducing the amount of the oxygen delivered to the brain. Tissue destruction initiates the synthesis and release of hormones or mediators into the blood which, when delivered to the brain, change its function. Irritation of the nerve endings in injured peripheral tissue or organs also contributes significantly to blast-induced neurotrauma.

Individuals exposed to blast frequently manifest loss of memory of events before and after explosion, confusion, headache, impaired sense of reality, and reduced decision-making ability. Patients with brain injuries acquired in explosions often develop sudden, unexpected brain swelling and cerebral vasospasm despite continuous monitoring. However, the first symptoms of blast-induced neurotrauma (BINT) may occur months or even years after the initial event, and are therefore categorized as secondary brain injuries. The broad variety of symptoms includes weight loss, hormone imbalance, chronic fatigue, headache, and problems in memory, speech and balance. These changes are often debilitating, interfering with daily activities. Because BINT in blast victims is underestimated, valuable time is often lost for preventive therapy and/or timely rehabilitation.

A study published in 2022 points to the use of blood-based biomarkers as a promising way to detect neurotrauma even in individuals without outward symptoms. The study found molecular changes consistent with neuroinflammation and vascular damage in service members who were exposed to repeated low-level blasts.

== Blast wave PTSD research ==
In addition to known post-traumatic stress disorder (PTSD) risk factors experienced by both civilians and military personnel in combat areas, in early 2018, 60 Minutes reported that neuropathology specialist, Dr. Daniel "Dan" Perl, had conducted research on brain tissue exposed to traumatic brain injury (TBI), discovering a causal relationship between IED blast waves and PTSD. Perl was recruited to the faculty of the Uniformed Services University of the Health Sciences as a professor of pathology and to establish the Center for Neuroscience and Regenerative Medicine mandated by Congress in 2008. In 2006, researchers found that many of the symptoms of PTSD, overlap with those of TBI, potentially leading to misdiagnosis in individuals who have experience blast injury.

== Casualty estimates and triage ==
Explosions in confined spaces or which cause structural collapse usually produce more deaths and injuries. Confined spaces include mines, buildings and large vehicles. For a rough estimate of the total casualties from an event, double the number that present in the first hour. Less injured patients often arrive first, as they take themselves to the nearest hospital. The most severely injured arrive later, via emergency services ("upside-down" triage). If there is a structural collapse, there will be more serious injuries that arrive more slowly.

== See also ==
- Battlefield medicine
- Blast-related ocular trauma
- Suicide attack
- Total body disruption
