= Blast-related ocular trauma =

Specialized group of penetrating and blunt force injuries to the eye and its structure

Blast-related ocular trauma comprises a specialized subgroup blast injuries which cause penetrating and blunt force injuries to the eye and its structure. The incidence of ocular trauma due to blast forces has increased dramatically with the introduction of new explosives technology into modern warfare. The availability of these volatile materials, coupled with the tactics of contemporary terrorism, has caused a rise in the number of homemade bombs capable of extreme physical harm.

== Military classification of improvised explosive devices ==
The United States Department of Defense classifies IEDs as explosive machines that are constructed exclusively (i.e., without mass production) and result in the direct physical harm of surrounding individuals. The use of these bombs by insurgents has been the number one cause of death and injury among Coalition soldiers since the start of Operation Iraqi Freedom in April 2003. Detonation of the IED occurs remotely or as victim-induced mechanical disturbance. Further classification of IEDs falls under the mechanism of delivery – vehicle-based, boat-borne, animal-borne, suicide bomber – and the resultant effect upon detonation:

- Explosive: Bombs of this nature incorporate chemicals and substances that result in the formation of a large blast; may incorporate pyrotechnics. Often employs shrapnel to inflict harm by mechanical trauma.
- Incendiary: utilize highly exothermic chemical processes to initiate the rapid spread of fire and pyrotechnic damage
- Chemical: Bombs in this class include noxious chemical materials that may cause a patho-physiological response in individuals exposed to the blast area during and post-explosion.
- Biological: Much like the chemical-type, with the exception that biological bombs use vector-borne pathogens or other biohazardous materials to initiate a patho-physiological response in exposed individuals.

== Explosion physics ==
The discharge of a bomb is characterized by the near-instantaneous sublimation of solids or rapid vaporization of liquids into the gas phase. The amount of explosive materials used, the concentration and identity of secondary materials incorporated into bomb design, and the location and height of bomb placement all determine the magnitude of the explosion. The gas formed displaces the surrounding medium – usually air – and causes a dramatic increase in pressure that forms a characteristic blast wave, often referred to as the leading shock wave. Physically, this wave is characterized as a non-linear, discontinuous wave front that features infinite amplitude and accompanying acoustic pressure wave that may generate a pressure as high as 100MPa in a time as short as one microsecond. This peak pressure, or blast overpressure point, generates a positive pressure during blast wave propagation and results in the dispersal of positive pressure across the blast radius. This positive pressure phase is immediately followed by a period of negative pressure relative to pre-blast conditions; this phase may also account for injuries sustained during a blast.

=== Impact of explosion upon individuals in the blast radius ===
The prevalence of mines in Operation Iraqi Freedom and Operation Enduring Freedom has made them the most frequent mechanism of injury behind the traumatic "signature" in modern warfare, blast-induced traumatic brain injury (bTBI). Whereas body armor has lowered the incidence of death due to collapse of gas-filled organs (the most frequent cause of blast-related deaths prior to Operation Desert Storm) healthcare providers must now develop methods for treating bTBI. Despite their frequency on the warfront, the home-produced nature of these mines makes classifying patient presentations difficult for military healthcare providers. The majority of lethal bTBIs reveal axonal shearing as the mechanism of fatality, with the greatest amount of nerve fiber and vascular shearing occurring in the frontal and temporal lobes.

Biophysicists have implicated acoustic impedance, or the ratio of acoustic pressure to particle velocity, as a factor contributing to blast damage in vivo. Wave transitions between tissues with significantly different acoustic impedances, particularly between the external environment and bone, causes focal mechanical damage as a result of wave energy dissipation. Current research has implicated the importance of a histological component in blast trauma; patients exposed to blast waves often present with elongation and/or splitting of cells due to the shear stress of a shockwave. This cellular damage often follows the direction of wave propagation. Patient distance from the epicenter, materials employed in the bomb design, and confinement of the bomb all determine the degree of trauma incurred by patients exposed to bombings. Additionally, skull size and geometry, the degree of tissue penetration by the wave, and a possible "lens effect" due to wave reflection upon incidence with the concave calvarium and/or dissipation in the gas-filled sinuses may further complicate wave transmission. Additionally, researchers have implicated both the auditory canals and the orbitals as potential routes for wave propagation into the central nervous system

== Blast-related ocular trauma ==
Ocular trauma is the fourth most common injury sustained in military combat today. In a pool of 387 randomly selected soldiers injured by blast trauma in Operation Iraqi Freedom, 329 (89%) sustained ocular trauma. Emergency treatment of resulting injuries falls under the realm of emergency care and effective patient triage, often incorporating protocols for blunt and penetrating trauma. As a result, physicians have devised a concise algorithm for the treatment of patients with ocular injuries secondary to blast trauma.

=== Mechanism of injury ===
Ocular trauma may result from primary blast exposure. Spallation forces arise as the blast wave displaces a dense medium across a less dense interface, and inertial forces may cause displacement of optical structures. Primary blast ocular trauma therefore comprises non-penetrating mechanical injuries such as hyphemas, ruptured globes, conjunctival hemorrhage, serous retinitis, and orbital fracture. However, ocular trauma most commonly falls under the realm of secondary blast injuries, in which debris displaced by the blast overpressure and resultant blast wave causes physical trauma to the eye and/or orbital. Therefore, secondary blast ocular trauma is distinguished by penetrating- or blunt-force injury to any of structural component of the eye or orbital; open globe injuries, adnexal lacerations of the lacrimal system, eyelids, and eyebrows comprise the majority of injuries in this group.

==== Skull flexure ====
Within the last two decades, researchers have reconsidered the role of the skull in bTBI. While it was originally considered that the skull remained static upon contact with the primary wave front, clinically significant skull flexure has been documented in vivo with rats exposed to blast waves and with model human heads exposed to blast conditions. In contact with a blast wave, the skull becomes elastic due to its deformable foundation – the external environment, the cerebrospinal fluid of the dura, and the brain itself. During a blast, the brain collides with the dynamic skull and rebounds in accordance with localized cranial pressure spikes. This trauma may account for the localized axonal injuries that characterize bTBI. Chavko et al. (2010) explored cranial position as a function of bTBI severity, finding that rats directly facing the blast wave front featured the highest intracranial amplitude and pressure duration periods (in comparison with rats perpendicular to the wave front and those facing away from the blast wave) Alessandra Dal Cengio Leonardi's group at Wayne State University expanded upon the skull flexure hypothesis in rat models, further correlating increased age and body mass to increases in intracranial pressure for rats in front-facing bTBI. Chavko's group remarked further on the role of Kevlar armor in fluid pressure damage to neurovasculature, finding that subcortical hemorrhage seen in bTBI patients has been linked to local pressurization rather than vascular hydrodynamics.

== Assessment and treatment in the military setting ==
The majority of blast-related ocular injuries occur in soldiers who present with other life-threatening injuries that require immediate intervention. Current Combat Support Hospital (CSH) protocol requires the surgical stabilization of any life-threatening injuries, as well as hemodynamic stability, prior to initial eye evaluation and surgical repair. Therefore, initiation of emergency ophthalmic care often occurs hours after injury. Initial examination by a military ophthalmologist begins with gross examination of each eye and orbital. 73-82% of all ocular injuries resulting from mine explosions are due to fragmentation of shrapnel upon detonation, so gross anatomical inspection by penlight may not rule out open globe injury. Harlan JB, Pieramici DJ. Evaluation of patients with ocular trauma. Ophthalmol Clin North Am. 2002; 15(2):153-61./ref> Computerized tomography (CT) may detect foreign matter and aid the clinician in determining the presence of an open-globe injury.

=== Closed globe injuries ===
Current military standard employs the Birmingham Eye Trauma Terminology System (BETTS) and Ocular Trauma Classification Group to define and treat blast injuries. Trauma is further split into two distinct groups: closed globe injury and open globe trauma. Treatment of closed globe trauma begins with the division of the eye into zones, each with unique anatomical structures and injury patterns:

- Zone I: the conjunctiva and corneal surface; the most common injuries seen in this zone are foreign debris retention by the conjunctiva or corneal epithelium/stroma, as well as corneal abrasions. The Seidel test may be used to evaluate the status of the anterior chamber, thereby determining the presence of corneal perforation and pathological anterior chamber leakage.
- Zone II: region designated by the anterior chamber, lens, and pars plicata; the most common injuries sustained in this region are hyphemas and traumatic cataracts. Application of the Seidel Test in Zone I will rule out seepage of the anterior chamber through a corneal perforation, while introduction of topical agents may reduce detected increases in intraocular pressure. Depending on the severity of other bodily injuries, the military ophthalmologist may conduct an anterior chamber washout to clear hyphemas. However, reconstruction of the anterior chamber and cataract surgery is often reserved for treatment in tertiary clinical centers.
- Zone III: this zone contains the vitreous cavity, retina, and optic nerve; injuries commonly observed in this region are vitreous hemorrhage, traumatic macular holes, retinal detachment, and optic nerve injury. Injury to the optic nerve requires neuro-ophthalmic examination, and may require neurosurgical intervention in the military hospital setting depending on the severity of the injury.

=== Open Globe Injuries ===
The presence of an open globe injury may be determined by clinical examination and CT. However, full globe exploration with 360-degree removal of the conjunctiva (periotomy), separation of the rectus muscles, and subsequent examination of the sclera remains the most effective way to determine whether or not the globe has been injured. During exploratory surgery, foreign debris may be removed with microsurgical tools by inspection under the operating room microscope. Globe lacerations are typically repaired as far posteriorly as possible to prevent any further deficits in visual acuity. Lacerations posterior to the exposed area are not sutured; attempts to seal these injuries often results in the extrusion of intraocular components. Healing of these injuries occurs naturally by scarring of dorsal orbital fat to the sclera. If a clinically significant increase in intraocular pressure is detected with orbital compartment syndrome, the ophthalmologist may perform an emergency canthotomy on the lateral canthus. Canalicular injuries, as well as lid lacerations, are also commonly repaired in the military hospital setting. Suturing the laceration after the removal of foreign bodies depends on the location of global fissure: 10-0 nylon with cyanoacrylate glue is commonly used on the cornea, and processed human pericardium may be employed if it is surgically available. Globe closure of the limbus and sclera requires 9-0 and 8-0 nylon, respectively.

If damage to the globe is irreparable, the ophthalmologist may conduct a primary enucleation, evisceration, or exenteration in the combat hospital. 14% of globe injuries sustained during Operation Iraqi Freedom have required enucleation. Implantation of an oculoplastic silicone sphere or similar device commonly follows these procedures.

== Post-Operative Care ==
Post-operative care for patients with blast-related ocular trauma occurs in tertiary care facilities. Patients with closed globe injuries require observation and follow-up examination with an optometrist, including slit lamp microscope and dilated fundus inspection. Those who have been treated for open-globe repairs often experience a delay of post-operative treatment that ranges from 10 to 14 days after injury. This period is due to the treatment of other life-threatening injuries, as well as the necessity for accurate estimation of visual acuity outside of inflammation due to injury and surgical intervention.

In patients with facial burns, exposure keratopathy, or chronic epiphora, an ophthalmologist may suggest eyelid reconstruction surgery. Depending on the severity of physical trauma sustained, surgical realignment of the extraocular muscles may relieve strabismus. Realignment of the extraocular muscles is also indicated in chronic diplopia that occurs within 20-degrees of the visual field. All patients that have sustained a traumatic brain injury in the absence of ocular trauma are still recommended to obtain examination by an optometrist. Outside of the treatment facility, these patients must monitor any signs of late-onset ocular pathologies secondary to the bTBI, including decreased visual/reading ability and speed, photophobia, blurred vision, reduced accommodation abilities, and headaches.

=== Visual Outcomes ===
Visual outcomes for patients with ocular trauma due to blast injuries vary, and prognoses depend upon the type of injury sustained. The majority of poor visual outcomes arise from perforating injuries: only 21% of patients with perforating injuries with pre-operative light perception had a final best-corrected visual acuity (BCVA) better than 20/200. Collectively, patients who experienced choroidal hemorrhage, perforated or penetrated globes, retinal detachment, traumatic optic neuropathy, and subretinal macular hemorrhage carried the highest incidence rates of BCVAs worse than 20/200. Reports from Operation Iraqi Freedom (OIF) indicate that 42% of soldiers with globe injuries of any kind had a BCVA greater than or equal to 20/40 six months after injury, and soldiers with intraocular foreign bodies (IOFBs) retained 20/40 or better vision in 52% of studied cases.

Globe perforation, oculoplastic intervention, and neuro-ophthalmic injuries contribute significantly to reported poor visual outcomes. 21% of tertiary centers treating patients exposed to blast trauma reported traumatic optic neuropathy (TON) in their patients, although avulsion of the optic nerve and TON were reported in only 3% of combat injuries. In the event that a victim of globe penetrating trauma cannot perceive any light within two weeks of surgical intervention, the ophthalmologist may choose to enucleate as a preventative measure against sympathetic ophthalmia. However, this procedure is extremely rare, and current reports indicate that only one soldier in OIF has undergone enucleation in a tertiary care facility to prevent sympathetic ophthalmia.

== Prevention ==
=== Eye armor ===
Prevention of ocular trauma is most effective when soldiers wear polycarbonate eye armor correctly in the battlefield. For Operation Iraqi Freedom and Operation Enduring Freedom, the United States Military have made Ballistic Laser Protective Spectacles (BLPS), Special Protective Eyewear Cylindrical System (SPECS), and Sun/Wind/Dust Goggles (SWDG) available to combatants and associated personnel. These forms of eye protection are available in non-prescription and prescription lenses, and their use has been made mandatory at all times when soldiers are in areas of potential conflict. Despite their proven record of protection against secondary blast trauma, soldier compliance remains low: 85% of soldiers afflicted ocular trauma in the first year of OEF were not wearing their protective lenses at the time of detonation. While 41% of soldiers could not recall whether or not they were wearing eye protection at the time of detonation, 17% of casualties were wearing eye protection while 26% of casualties were not. Among this group, the poorest visual prognoses were documented in individuals who did not wear eye protection. The lack of compliance has been attributed to complaints about comfort, stylishness, and "misting" of the lenses when in the field. BLPS and SPECS offer the same line of protection against secondary trauma as the SWD goggles, and these lenses may overcome the complaints many soldiers have with their military-issue goggles.

=== Eye Armor and the Primary Blast Wave Trauma ===
Despite the success of goggles and lenses against ballistic and secondary trauma, BLPS, SPECS, and SWDG forms of eye armor do not protect against primary-blast injuries. The space between the lenses and the eyes promotes sonic wave diffraction, and current efforts to eradicate ocular trauma due to the primary blast wave have been unsuccessful due to this lens-eye air interface.

=== Helmet Design and Blast-Related Traumatic Brain Injury ===
Additionally, current researchers have correlated helmet design to an amplification of waves that may cause bTBI. Moss et al. (2009) used model human heads outfitted with helmets approved for use in OEF and OIF and subjected them to blast waves at 194G for 2.1 milliseconds. These helmets, the Modular Integrated Communications Helmet (MICH) feature a mesh netting that offers comfort between the wearer's head and the helmet's Kevlar shell. While effective against ballistic trauma, Moss's group reported that skull flexure is amplified by the air interface between the helmet and the skull. This space may amplify the effects of bTBI, and the group suggested that a foam connection between the helmet and the wearer's head may diminish the effects of the peak pressure wave during an explosion.

=== BrainPort Vision Device ===
A tremendous amount of the research surrounding war-related ocular trauma has come from the Academic Department of Military Surgery and Trauma (ADMST) In conjunction with Wicab Industries, the ADMST has developed the BrainPort Vision Device, a sensory substitute for soldiers blinded in service. The device uses the tongue, coupled with a camera mounted on a pair of sunglasses, to provide the user with an electrotactile depiction of the environment. After calibration and practice, the user may interpret objects, shapes, and patterns in their immediate surroundings.
