= Apraclonidine =

Chemical compound

Clinical data
- Trade names: Iopidine, others
- Other names: Apraclonidine hydrochloride (JAN JP), Apraclonidine hydrochloride (USAN US)
- AHFS/Drugs.com: Monograph
- MedlinePlus: a608005
- License data: US DailyMed: Apraclonidine
- Routes of administration: Ophthalmic administration
- ATC code: S01EA03 (WHO)

Legal status
- Legal status: UK: POM (Prescription only); US: ℞-only / OTC; In general: ℞ (Prescription only)

Pharmacokinetic data
- Protein binding: 98.7%
- Elimination half-life: 8 hours

Identifiers
- IUPAC name: 2,6-Dichloro-N- (4,5-dihydro-1H-imidazol-2-yl) benzene-1,4-diamine
- CAS Number: 66711-21-5; 73218-79-8
- PubChem CID: 2216; 51763
- IUPHAR/BPS: 7117
- DrugBank: DB00964
- ChemSpider: 2130
- UNII: 843CEN85DI; D2VW67N38H
- KEGG: D07461; D01008
- ChEBI: CHEBI:2788
- ChEMBL: ChEMBL647
- CompTox Dashboard (EPA): DTXSID1048415
- ECHA InfoCard: 100.164.104

Chemical and physical data
- Formula: C_{9}H_{10}Cl_{2}N_{4}
- Molar mass: 245.11 g·mol^{−1}
- 3D model (JSmol): Interactive image
- SMILES: Clc1c(c(Cl)cc(N)c1)N/C2=N/CCN2
- InChI: InChI=1S/C9H10Cl2N4/c10-6-3-5(12)4-7(11)8(6)15-9-13-1-2-14-9/h3-4H,1-2,12H2,(H2,13,14,15); Key:IEJXVRYNEISIKR-UHFFFAOYSA-N; Key:OTQYGBJVDRBCHC-UHFFFAOYSA-N

Apraclonidine (INN), sold under the brand name Iopidine among others, is a medication used for the treatment of intraocular pressure. It is an alpha-adrenergic agonist. It is used as the salt apraclonidine hydrochloride. It is given by ophthalmic administration.

== Medical uses ==
Apraclonidine is indicated to control or prevent post-surgical elevations in intraocular pressure that occur in people after argon laser trabeculoplasty, argon laser iridotomy, or Nd:YAG posterior capsulotomy.

== Society and culture ==
=== Legal status ===
Apraclonidine was approved for medical use in the United States in 1987.

=== Names ===
Apraclonidine is sold under the brand names Iopidine and Brytly.
