= Intrascleral plexus =

Network of blood vessels within the sclera of the eye

Details
- Drains from: Schlemm's canal
- Drains to: Anterior ciliary veins

The intrascleral plexus is the network of blood vessels within the substance of the sclera. Blood enters from the small connecting channels from Schlemm's canal; it exits through superficial vessels, then passing it on to the anterior ciliary veins.
