= Streptomyces pseudovenezuelae =

Scientific classification
- Domain: Bacteria
- Kingdom: Bacillati
- Phylum: Actinomycetota
- Class: Actinomycetia
- Order: Streptomycetales
- Family: Streptomycetaceae
- Genus: Streptomyces
- Species: S. pseudovenezuelae

Binomial name
- Streptomyces pseudovenezuelae Pridham 1970

Type strain
- ATCC 23951, BCRC 11487, CBS 934.68, CCRC 11487, CGMCC 4.1754, DSM 40212, DSM 41368, IFO 12904, IMET 43512, IMRU 3774, ISP 5212, JCM 11516, JCM 4405, KCC S-0405, NBRC 12904, NRRL B-3623, NRRL-ISP 5212, RIA 1158, RIA 742, VKM Ac-1199

Synonyms
- Actinomyces pseudovenezuelae

Species of bacterium

Streptomyces pseudovenezuelae is a bacterium species from the genus of Streptomyces which has been isolated from lead polluted soil in China. Streptomyces pseudovenezuelae produces chloramphenicol and setomimycin.

== See also ==
- List of Streptomyces species
