= Rebstock =

Rebstock (German for "grapevine") is a German surname. Notable people with the surname include:

- Erik Rebstock (born 1987), German sprint canoeist
- Mildred Rebstock (1919–2011), American pharmaceutical chemist
- Paula Rebstock (born 1960), American-born New Zealand public servant

== See also ==
- Frankfurt-Rebstock Airfield, a German Luftwaffe airport in the city of Frankfurt, Germany
