= Glucose-1-phosphate guanylyltransferase =

Class of enzymes

Identifiers
- EC no.: 2.7.7.34
- CAS no.: 9033-13-0

Databases
- IntEnz: IntEnz view
- BRENDA: BRENDA entry
- ExPASy: NiceZyme view
- KEGG: KEGG entry
- MetaCyc: metabolic pathway
- PRIAM: profile
- PDB structures: RCSB PDB PDBe PDBsum
- Gene Ontology: AmiGO / QuickGO
Search
- PMC: articles
- PubMed: articles
- NCBI: proteins

Glucose-1-phosphate guanylyltransferase (EC 2.7.7.34) is an enzyme that catalyzes the chemical reaction

guanosine triphosphate
+
glucose 1-phosphate
PP_{i}
GDP-glucose

The enzyme characterised from mast cell tumors combines guanosine triphosphate and glucose 1-phosphate to give GDP-glucose, with pyrophosphate (PP_{i}) as a byproduct. In Streptomyces venezuelae this reaction is part of the biosynthetic pathway to trehalose 6-phosphate.

This enzyme is a transferase, specifically one transferring phosphorus-containing nucleotide groups (nucleotidyltransferases). The systematic name of this enzyme class is GTP:alpha-D-glucose-1-phosphate guanylyltransferase. Other names in common use include GDP glucose pyrophosphorylase, and guanosine diphosphoglucose pyrophosphorylase.
