= Chloramphenicol phosphotransferase-like protein family =

Chloramphenicol phosphotransferase-like protein
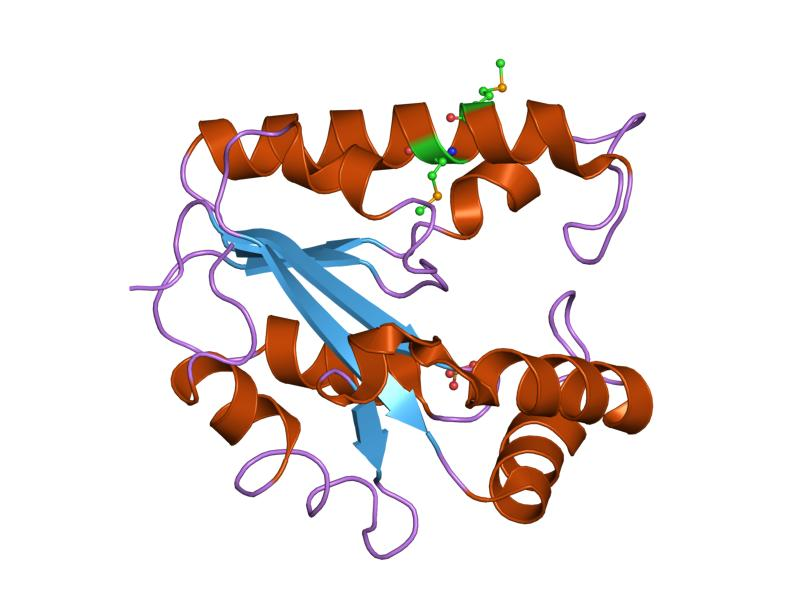
- crystal structure of atu3015, a putative cytidylate kinase from agrobacterium tumefaciens, northeast structural genomics target atr62

Identifiers
- Symbol: CPT
- Pfam: PF07931
- Pfam clan: CL0023
- InterPro: IPR012853
- SCOP2: 1grq / SCOPe / SUPFAM
- CDD: cd00227
Available protein structures:
- PDB: IPR012853 PF07931 (ECOD; PDBsum)
- AlphaFold: IPR012853; PF07931

In molecular biology, the chloramphenicol phosphotransferase-like protein family includes the chloramphenicol 3-O phosphotransferase (CPT) expressed by Streptomyces venezuelae. Chloramphenicol (Cm) is a metabolite produced by this bacterium that can inhibit ribosomal peptidyl transferase activity and therefore protein production. By transferring a phosphate group to the C-3 hydroxyl group of Cm, CPT inactivates this potentially lethal metabolite.
