= Streptomyces omiyaensis =

Scientific classification
- Domain: Bacteria
- Kingdom: Bacillati
- Phylum: Actinomycetota
- Class: Actinomycetes
- Order: Streptomycetales
- Family: Streptomycetaceae
- Genus: Streptomyces
- Species: S. omiyaensis

Binomial name
- Streptomyces omiyaensis Umezawa and Okami 1950

Type strain
- ATCC 27454, BCRC 11897, CBS 750.72, CCRC 11897, CGMCC 4.1987, DSM 40552, ETH 28372, IFO 13449, IMET 43362, ISP 5552, JCM 4806, NBRC 13449, NIHJ 102, NRRL B-1587, NRRL-ISP 5552, RIA 1410, VKM Ac-1903

Species of bacterium

Streptomyces omiyaensis is a bacterium species from the genus of Streptomyces which has been isolated from soil in Japan. Streptomyces omiyaensis produces chloramphenicol and pentalenolactone P.

== See also ==
- List of Streptomyces species
