= Jadomycin =

Jadomycin B
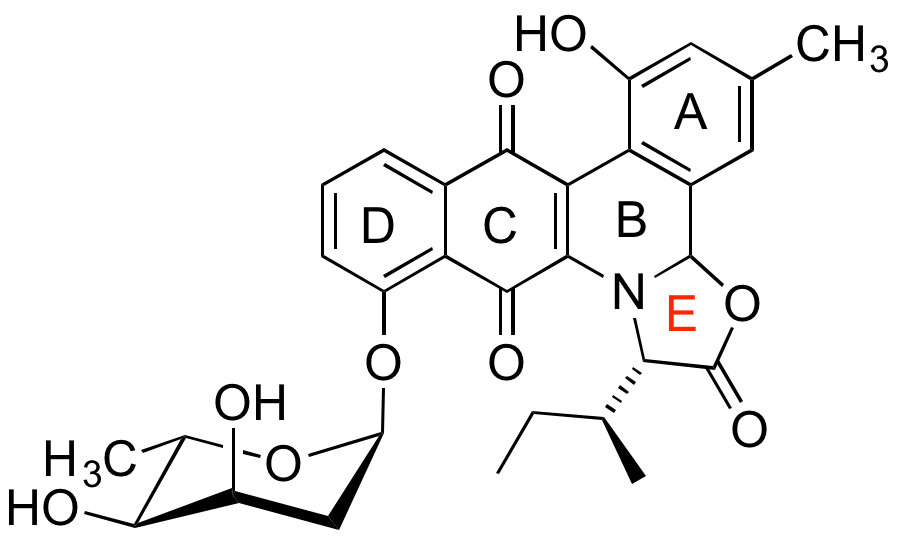

Names
- Other names Jadomycin L-isoleucine

Identifiers
CAS Number	B: 149633-99-8
3D model (JSmol)	A: Interactive image; B: Interactive image; N: Interactive image; S: Interactive image; W: Interactive image
ChEBI	A: CHEBI:81887; B: CHEBI:31738
ChEMBL	B: ChEMBL1631684; N: ChEMBL1631761; S: ChEMBL1631758
ChemSpider	A: 28288204; B: 26376522; S: 29355742
KEGG	A: C18680; B: C12395
PubChem CID	A: 12160163; B: 50986109; N: 53319422; S: 71657833; W: 101561181
- InChI: A: InChI=1S/C24H21NO6/c1-4-11(3)19-24(30)31-23-13-8-10(2)9-15(27)16(13)18-20(25(19)23)22(29)17-12(21(18)28)6-5-7-14(17)26/h5-9,11,19,23,26-27H,4H2,1-3H3/t11-,19-,23-/m0/s1 Key: AVMSKCRHMKXYOO-JNVIWZAMSA-N; B: InChI=1S/C30H31NO9/c1-5-13(3)24-30(37)40-29-16-9-12(2)10-17(32)21(16)23-25(31(24)29)28(36)22-15(27(23)35)7-6-8-19(22)39-20-11-18(33)26(34)14(4)38-20/h6-10,13-14,18,20,24,26,29,32-34H,5,11H2,1-4H3/t13-,14-,18+,20-,24-,26-,29-/m0/s1 Key: BSBSCJRAEMDCHC-FTERDKBNSA-N; N: InChI=1S/C28H26N2O10/c1-10-6-13-20(15(31)7-10)22-23(30-14(28(37)38)8-18(33)29-27(13)30)26(36)21-12(25(22)35)4-3-5-17(21)40-19-9-16(32)24(34)11(2)39-19/h3-7,11,14,16,19,24,27,31-32,34H,8-9H2,1-2H3,(H,29,33)(H,37,38)/t11-,14-,16+,19-,24-,27+/m0/s1 Key: GYNMVHWDURGLEN-FKHGBPLUSA-N; S: InChI=1S/C27H25NO10/c1-10-6-13-19(15(30)7-10)21-22(28-14(9-29)27(35)38-26(13)28)25(34)20-12(24(21)33)4-3-5-17(20)37-18-8-16(31)23(32)11(2)36-18/h3-7,11,14,16,18,23,26,29-32H,8-9H2,1-2H3/t11-,14-,16+,18-,23-,26?/m0/s1 Key: YJZPHITXTBWGEN-IUHCOWDHSA-N; W: InChI=1S/C35H30N2O9/c1-15-10-20-27(23(38)11-15)29-30(37-22(35(43)46-34(20)37)12-17-14-36-21-8-4-3-6-18(17)21)33(42)28-19(32(29)41)7-5-9-25(28)45-26-13-24(39)31(40)16(2)44-26/h3-11,14,16,22,24,26,31,34,36,38-40H,12-13H2,1-2H3/t16-,22-,24+,26-,31-,34?/m0/s1 Key: LQAICFQKBUVZMC-XSMVYFONSA-N
- SMILES: A: CC[C@H](C)[C@H]1C(=O)O[C@@H]2N1C3=C(C4=C(C=C(C=C24)C)O)C(=O)C5=C(C3=O)C(=CC=C5)O; B: CC[C@H](C)[C@H]1C(=O)O[C@@H]2N1C3=C(C4=C(C=C(C=C24)C)O)C(=O)C5=C(C3=O)C(=CC=C5)O[C@H]6C[C@H]([C@H]([C@@H](O6)C)O)O; N: C[C@H]1[C@@H]([C@@H](C[C@@H](O1)OC2=CC=CC3=C2C(=O)C4=C(C3=O)C5=C(C=C(C=C5O)C)[C@H]6N4[C@@H](CC(=O)N6)C(=O)O)O)O; S: C[C@H]1[C@@H]([C@@H](C[C@@H](O1)OC2=CC=CC3=C2C(=O)C4=C(C3=O)C5=C(C=C(C=C5C6N4[C@H](C(=O)O6)CO)C)O)O)O; W: C[C@H]1[C@@H]([C@@H](C[C@@H](O1)OC2=CC=CC3=C2C(=O)C4=C(C3=O)C5=C(C=C(C=C5C6N4[C@H](C(=O)O6)CC7=CNC8=CC=CC=C87)C)O)O)O

Properties
Chemical formula	C_{30}H_{31}NO_{9}
Molar mass	549.576 g·mol^{−1}
Appearance	Deep red-purple solid
Solubility	Soluble in various organic solvents
- Except where otherwise noted, data are given for materials in their standard state (at 25 °C [77 °F], 100 kPa). Infobox references

A jadomycin is a natural product produced by Streptomyces venezuelae ISP5230 (ATCC10712), the organism which is most well known for making the antibiotic chloramphenicol. The name jadomycin is applied to a family of related angucyclines which are distinguished by the E ring (usually an oxoazolone ring), which is derived from an amino acid. The amino acid incorporation which forms the E-ring is a chemical reaction, rather than enzymatic, an uncommon occurrence in biosynthesis. As such a number of jadomycins incorporating different amino acids have been discovered. Jadomycin A was the first compound of this family to be isolated and constitutes the angucylic backbone with L-isoleucine incorporated into the E-ring. A related analog, jadomycin B, is modified by glycosylation with a 2,6-dideoxy sugar, L-digitoxose. Jadomycins have cytotoxic and antibacterial properties.

== Biosynthesis ==
The jadomycin biosynthetic gene cluster is well characterized. Jadomycin biosynthesis encompasses type II polyketide synthase (T2Pks) assembly to generate the angucycline component, and a dideoxy sugar pathway, to generate the sugar donor NDP-L-digitoxose. Studies have implicated JadG, an FAD-dependent oxygenase, in the ring cleavage required for incorporation of amino acids. JadS, the glycosyltransferase that transfers L-digitoxose, has been shown to be flexible with respect to the sugar donor.

== Analogs based on E-ring modification ==
Jadomycin analogs have been obtained through culture of S. venezuelae in the presence of a single amino acid. The diversity of jadomycins includes those incorporating naturally occurring amino acids, non-proteinogenic amino acids, and synthetic amino acids with handles enabling further chemical modification.
