= Streptomyces zaomyceticus =

Streptomyces zagrosensis

Scientific classification
- Domain: Bacteria
- Kingdom: Bacillati
- Phylum: Actinomycetota
- Class: Actinomycetes
- Order: Streptomycetales
- Family: Streptomycetaceae
- Genus: Streptomyces
- Species: S. zagrosensis

Binomial name
- Streptomyces zagrosensis Hinuma 1954

Type strain
- ATCC 27482, BCRC 12317, CBS 649.72, CCRC 12317, DSM 40196

Species of bacterium

Streptomyces zaomyceticus is a bacterium species from the genus of Streptomyces, which has been isolated from soil in Japan. Streptomyces zaomyceticus is a species of actinobacteria. This species is Gram-positive, filamentous, and aerobic. Streptomyces zaomyceticus produces zaomycin, pikromycin, glumamycin and foroxomithine.

== Biotechnological and environmental applications ==
Several studies have revealed the versatility of S. zaomyceticus for biotechnological applications.

Streptomyces zaomyceticus has been identified as a promising probiotic candidate for combating fish pathogens. It has been shown to express the ability to colonize host tissues and potentially be used as a probiotic in aquaculture.

Streptomyces zaomyceticus has shown the ability to recycle by breaking down chitosan, turning waste into helpful products such as glucosamine and N-acetyl.

Streptomyces zaomyceticus has a natural ability to synthesize copper oxide nanoparticles. The nanoparticles kill or stop the growth of various fungi and bacteria. Streptomyces zaomyceticus could be used in future biotechnology for medicines and agricultural treatment.

Streptomyces zaomyceticus has been found in Egyptian soil, and it produces a strong pigment. This species has been found to create natural and safe pigments that can replace chemically made dyes (synthetic).

== See also ==
- List of Streptomyces species
