= Gray baby syndrome =

- Other names: Grey baby syndrome, gray syndrome, grey syndrome
- Specialty: Pediatrics, infectious disease, toxicology
- Symptoms: Vomiting, greenish diarrhea, abdominal distension, hypothermia, pallid cyanosis, irregular respiration, circulatory collapse
- Complications: Bleeding, hepatic failure, anemia, kernicterus, death
- Usual onset: Neonates
- Causes: Accumulation of chloramphenicol
- Diagnostic method: proper history taking, monitoring blood level of the drug

Gray baby syndrome (also termed gray syndrome or grey syndrome) is a rare but serious, even fatal, side effect that occurs in newborn infants (especially premature babies) following the accumulation of the antibiotic chloramphenicol.

Chloramphenicol is a broad-spectrum antibiotic that has been used to treat a variety of bacteria infections like Streptococcus pneumoniae as well as typhoid fever, meningococcal sepsis, cholera, and eye infections. Chloramphenicol works by binding to prokaryotic large ribosomal subunits to block charged transfer ribonucleic acid (tRNA) binding and prevent the synthesis of bacterial proteins. Chloramphenicol has also been used to treat neonates born before 37 weeks of the gestational period for prophylactic purposes.

In 1958, newborns born prematurely due to rupture of the amniotic sac were given chloramphenicol to prevent possible infections, and it was noticed that these newborns had a higher mortality rate compared with those who were not treated with the antibiotic. Over the years, chloramphenicol has been used less in clinical practice due to the risks of toxicity not only to neonates, but also to adults due to the risk of aplastic anemia. Chloramphenicol is now reserved to treat certain severe bacteria infections that were not successfully treated with other antibiotic medications.

== Signs and symptoms ==
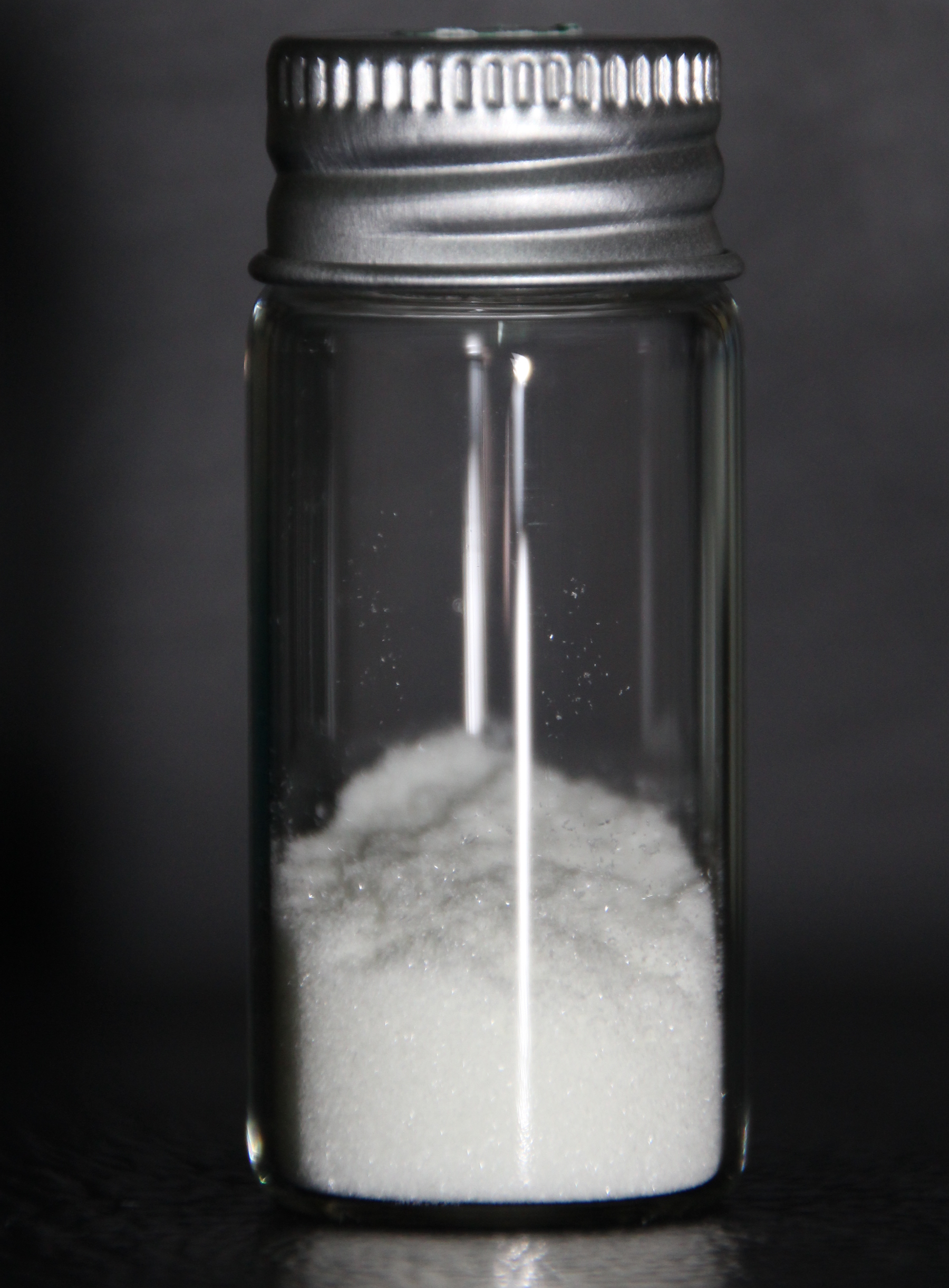
Chloramphenicol powder

Since the syndrome is due to the accumulation of chloramphenicol, the signs and symptoms are dose-related. According to Kasten's review published in the Mayo Clinic Proceedings, a serum concentration of more than 50 μg/mL is a warning sign, while Hammett-Stabler and John states that the common therapeutics peak level is 10-20 μg/mL and is expected to achieve after 0.5-1.5 hours of intravenous administration in their review of antimicrobial drugs. The common onset of signs and symptoms are 2 to 9 days after the initiation of the medication, which allows the serum concentration to build up to reach the toxic concentration above. Common signs and symptoms include loss of appetite, fussiness, vomiting, ashen gray color of the skin, hypotension (low blood pressure), cyanosis (blue discoloration of lips and skin), hypothermia, cardiovascular collapse, hypotonia (muscle stiffness), abdominal distension, irregular respiration, and increased blood lactate.

== Pathophysiology ==
Two pathophysiologic mechanisms are thought to play a role in the development of gray baby syndrome after exposure to chloramphenicol. This condition is due to a lack of glucuronidation reactions occurring in the baby (phase II hepatic metabolism), thus leading to an accumulation of toxic chloramphenicol metabolites:

1. Metabolism: The UDP-glucuronyl transferase enzyme system in infants, especially premature infants, is not fully developed and incapable of metabolizing the excessive drug load needed to excrete chloramphenicol.
2. Elimination: Insufficient renal excretion of the unconjugated drug.

Insufficient metabolism and excretion of chloramphenicol leads to increased blood concentrations of the drug, causing blockade of the electron transport of the liver, myocardium, and skeletal muscles. Since the electron transport is an essential part of cellular respiration, its blockade can result in cell damage. In addition, the presence of chloramphenicol weakens the binding of bilirubin and albumin, so increased levels of the drug can lead to high levels of free bilirubin in the blood, resulting in brain damage or kernicterus. If left untreated, possible bleeding, renal (kidney) and/or hepatic (liver) failure, anemia, infection, confusion, weakness, blurred vision, or eventually death are expected. Additionally, chloramphenicol is significantly insoluble due to an absence of acidic and basic groups in its molecular compound. As a result, larger amounts of the medication are required to achieve the desired therapeutic effect. High volumes of a medication that can cause various toxicities is another avenue how chloramphenicol can potentially lead to grey baby syndrome.

== Diagnosis ==
Gray baby syndrome should be suspected in a newborn with abdominal distension, progressive pallid cyanosis, irregular respirations, and refusal to breastfeed. The cause of gray baby syndrome can come from the direct use of intravenous or oral chloramphenicol in neonates. Direct chronological relation between the use of the medication and signs and symptoms of the syndrome should be found in the previous medical history.

In terms of the possible route of chloramphenicol, gray baby syndrome do not come from the mother's use of chloramphenicol during pregnancy or breastfeeding. According to the Drug and Lactation database (LactMed), it states that "milk concentrations are not sufficient to induce gray baby syndrome". It is also reported that the syndrome may not develop in infants when their mothers use the medication in their late period of pregnancy. According to the Oxford Review, chloramphenicol given to mothers during their pregnancy did not result in gray baby syndrome, but was caused by infants receiving supra-therapeutic doses of chloramphenicol after birth.

The presentation of symptoms can depend on the level of exposure of the drug to the baby, given its dose-related nature. A broad diagnosis is usually needed for babies who present with cyanosis. To support the diagnosis, blood work should be done to determine the level of serum chloramphenicol, and to further evaluate chloramphenicol toxicity, a metabolic panel and a complete blood panel including levels of serum ketones and glucose (due to the risk of hypoglycemia) should be completed to help determine if an infant has the syndrome. Other tools used to help with diagnosis include CT scans, ultrasound, and electrocardiogram.

== Prevention ==
Since the syndrome is a side effect of chloramphenicol, the prevention is primarily related to the proper use of the medication. The WHO Model Formulary for Children 2010 recommends to reserve chloramphenicol for life-threatening infections. As well as using chloramphenicol only when necessary, it should also be limited to short periods of time to also prevent the potential for toxicity. In particular, this medication should not be prescribed especially in neonates less than one week old due to the significant risk of toxicity. Preterm infants especially should not be administered chloramphenicol. Gray baby syndrome has been noted to be dose-dependent as it typically occurs in neonates who have received a daily dose greater than 200 milligrams.

When chloramphenicol is necessary, the condition can be prevented by using the recommended doses and monitoring blood levels, or alternatively, third generation cephalosporins can be effectively substituted for the drug, without the associated toxicity. Also, repeated administration and prolonged treatment should be avoided. In terms of neonatal hepatic development, it take only weeks from birth for them to develop their UDPGT expression and function to be at an adult-like level, while the function is only about 1% in the late pregnancy, even right before birth. According to MSD Manuals, chloramphenicol should not be given to neonates younger than 1 month of age with more than a dose of 25 mg/kg/day to start with. The serum concentration of the medication should be monitored to titrate to a therapeutic level and to prevent toxicity.

Reconciliation of other medications that neonates may be taking that can decrease blood cell count should be monitored because this medication can suppress bone marrow activity. Rifampicin and trimethoprim are examples of such medications and are contraindicated for concomitant use with chloramphenicol. Regarding bone marrow suppression, chloramphenicol has two major etiological manifestations. The first affects hematopoiesis, and this is reversible being an early sign of toxicity. The second is bone marrow aplasia, associated with terminal toxicity, and sometimes irreversible.

Chloramphenicol is contraindicated in breastfeeding due to the risk of toxic effects to the baby. However, if maternal use cannot be avoided, close monitoring of the baby's symptoms such as feeding difficulties and blood work is recommended.

== Treatment ==
Chloramphenicol therapy should be stopped immediately if objective or subjective signs of gray baby syndrome are suspected since gray baby syndrome can be fatal for the infant if not diagnosed early as it can lead to anemia, shock, and terminal organ damage. After discontinuing the antibiotic, the side effects caused by the toxicity should be treated. This includes treating hypoglycemia to help prevent hemodynamic instability, as well as warming the infant if they have developed hypothermia.

Since symptoms of gray baby syndrome are correlated with elevated serum chloramphenicol concentrations, exchange transfusion may be required to remove the drug. Charcoal column hemoperfusion is a type of transfusion that has shown significant effects but is associated with numerous side effects. The associated side effects are not the only reason why this method of treatment is not a first line therapy. According to the American Journal of Kidney Diseases, elevated cartridge prices and viable lifespan of the product are deterring factors to consider. Phenobarbital and theophylline are two drugs in particular that have shown significant efficacy with charcoal hemoperfusion, aside from its most significant indication for chronic aluminum toxicity in people with end-stage renal disease (ESRD) traditionally. Sometimes, phenobarbital is used to induce UDP-glucuronyl transferase enzyme function.

For hemodynamically unstable neonates, supportive care measures such as resuscitation, oxygenation, and treatment for hypothermia are common practices when cessation of chloramphenicol alone is insufficient. With sepsis being a complication of severe gray baby syndrome, usage of broad-spectrum antibiotics such as vancomycin, for example, is a recommended treatment option. Third generation antibiotics have also proven efficacy in treating gray baby-induced sepsis.
