= International Dispensary Association Foundation =

IDA Foundation
- International Dispensary Association Foundation
- Founded: 1972
- Type: Not-for-profit Social enterprise
- Headquarters: Amsterdam, Netherlands
- Location: Slochterweg 35, 1027 AA Amsterdam
- Coordinates: 52.3927°N 4.9614°E
- Region served: Worldwide (130+ countries)
- Products: Essential medicines, medical supplies
- Key people: Wendy Eggen (CEO); Jenno Ipema (CFO)
- Website: www.idafoundation.org

The International Dispensary Association Foundation (IDA Foundation) was created in 1972 in Amsterdam. Its goal is to improve access to important medications and health care equipment in the developing world. It works to achieve this by directly selling these items to organizations working in those areas of the world. It is a not for profit organisation. As of 2019 they were selling more than 3,000 products in more than 130 countries. What they distribute is based in part on the WHO Model List of Essential Medicines.

Oily chloramphenicol (or chloramphenicol oil suspension) is a long-acting preparation of chloramphenicol first introduced by Roussel Uclaf in 1954; marketed as Tifomycine, it was originally used as a treatment for typhoid. Roussel stopped production of oily chloramphenicol in 1995; the IDA Foundation has manufactured it since 1998, first in Malta and then in India from December 2004.
