= Streptomyces venezuelae =

Scientific classification
- Domain: Bacteria
- Kingdom: Bacillati
- Phylum: Actinomycetota
- Class: Actinomycetes
- Order: Streptomycetales
- Family: Streptomycetaceae
- Genus: Streptomyces
- Species: S. venezuelae

Binomial name
- Streptomyces venezuelae Ehrlich 1948

Species of bacterium

Streptomyces venezuelae is a species of soil-dwelling Gram-positive bacterium of the genus Streptomyces. S. venezuelae is filamentous. In its spore-bearing stage, hyphae perfuse both above ground as aerial hyphae and in the soil substrate. Chloramphenicol, the first antibiotic to be manufactured synthetically on a large scale, was originally derived from S. venezuelae. Other secondary metabolites produced by S. venezuelae include jadomycin and pikromycin.

== See also ==
- Chloramphenicol phosphotransferase-like protein family
