= Pikromycin =

Names
- IUPAC name (3R,5R,6S,7S,9R,11E,13S,14R)-14-Ethyl-13-hydroxy-3,5,7,9,13-pentamethyl-6-[3,4,6-trideoxy-3-(dimethylamino)-β-D-xylo-hexopyranosyloxy]-1-oxacyclotetradec-11-ene-2,4,10-trione
- Systematic IUPAC name (3R,5R,6S,7S,9R,11E,13S,14R)-6-{[(2S,3R,4S,6R)-4-(Dimethylamino)-3-hydroxy-6-methyloxan-2-yl]oxy}-14-ethyl-13-hydroxy-3,5,7,9,13-pentamethyl-1-oxacyclotetradec-11-ene-2,4,10-trione
- Other names Picromycin

Identifiers
CAS Number	19721-56-3
3D model (JSmol)	Interactive image
ChEBI	CHEBI:29665
ChemSpider	4445267
PubChem CID	5282037
UNII	FBM8G3Z439
CompTox Dashboard (EPA)	DTXSID201026584
- InChI: InChI=1S/C28H47NO8/c1-10-22-28(7,34)12-11-21(30)15(2)13-16(3)25(18(5)23(31)19(6)26(33)36-22)37-27-24(32)20(29(8)9)14-17(4)35-27/h11-12,15-20,22,24-25,27,32,34H,10,13-14H2,1-9H3/b12-11+/t15-,16+,17-,18+,19-,20+,22-,24-,25+,27+,28+/m1/s1 Key: UZQBOFAUUTZOQE-VSLWXVDYSA-N; InChI=1S/C28H47NO8/c1-10-22-28(7,34)12-11-21(30)15(2)13-16(3)25(18(5)23(31)19(6)26(33)36-22)37-27-24(32)20(29(8)9)14-17(4)35-27/h11-12,15-20,22,24-25,27,32,34H,10,13-14H2,1-9H3/b12-11+/t15-,16+,17-,18+,19-,20+,22-,24-,25+,27+,28+/m1/s1
- SMILES: O=C2[C@@H]([C@@H](O[C@@H]1O[C@@H](C[C@H](N(C)C)[C@H]1O)C)[C@@H](C)C[C@H](C(=O)/C=C/[C@@](O)(C)[C@H](OC(=O)[C@@H]2C)CC)C)C

Properties
Chemical formula	C_{28}H_{47}NO_{8}
Molar mass	525.683 g·mol^{−1}
- Except where otherwise noted, data are given for materials in their standard state (at 25 °C [77 °F], 100 kPa). verify (what is ?) Infobox references

Pikromycin was studied by Brokmann and Hekel in 1951 and was the first antibiotic macrolide to be isolated. Pikromycin is synthesized through a type I polyketide synthase system in Streptomyces venezuelae, a species of Gram-positive bacterium in the genus Streptomyces. Pikromycin is derived from narbonolide, a 14-membered ring macrolide. Along with the narbonolide backbone, pikromycin includes a desosamine sugar and a hydroxyl group. Although Pikromycin is not a clinically useful antibiotic, it can be used as a raw material to synthesize antibiotic ketolide compounds such as erythromycins and new epothilones.

== Biosynthesis ==
The pikromycin polyketide synthase of Streptomyces venezuelae contains four polypeptides: PikAI, PikAII, PikAIII, and PikAIV. These polypeptides contain a loading module, six extension molecules, and a thioesterase domain that terminated the biosynthetic procedure. Recently electron cryo-microscopy have been used to determine sub-nanometre-resolution three- dimensional reconstructions of a full-length PKS module from the bacterium Streptomyces venezuelae that revealed an unexpectedly different architecture. In Figure 1, each circle corresponds to a PKS mutilifuctional protein, where ACP is acyl carrier protein, KS is keto-ACP synthase, KSQ is a keto-ACP synthase like domain, AT is acyltransferase, KR is keto ACP reductase, KR with cross is inactive KR, DH is hydroxyl-thioester dehydratase, ER is enoyl reductase, TEI is thioesterase domain I, TEII is type II thioesterase. Des corresponds to the enzymes utilized in desosamine biosynthesis and transfer, which include DesI-DesVIII.

Figure 2 represents the desosamine deoxyamino sugar biosynthetic pathway. DesI-DesVI (des locus of pikromycin PKS) encodes all the enzymes needed to obtain TDP-desoamine from TDP-glucose. DesVII and DesVIII activities transfer desoamine to narbonolide and narbomycin is obtained. PikC cytochrome P450 hydrolase catalyzes the hydroxylation of narbomycin to obtain pikromycin.

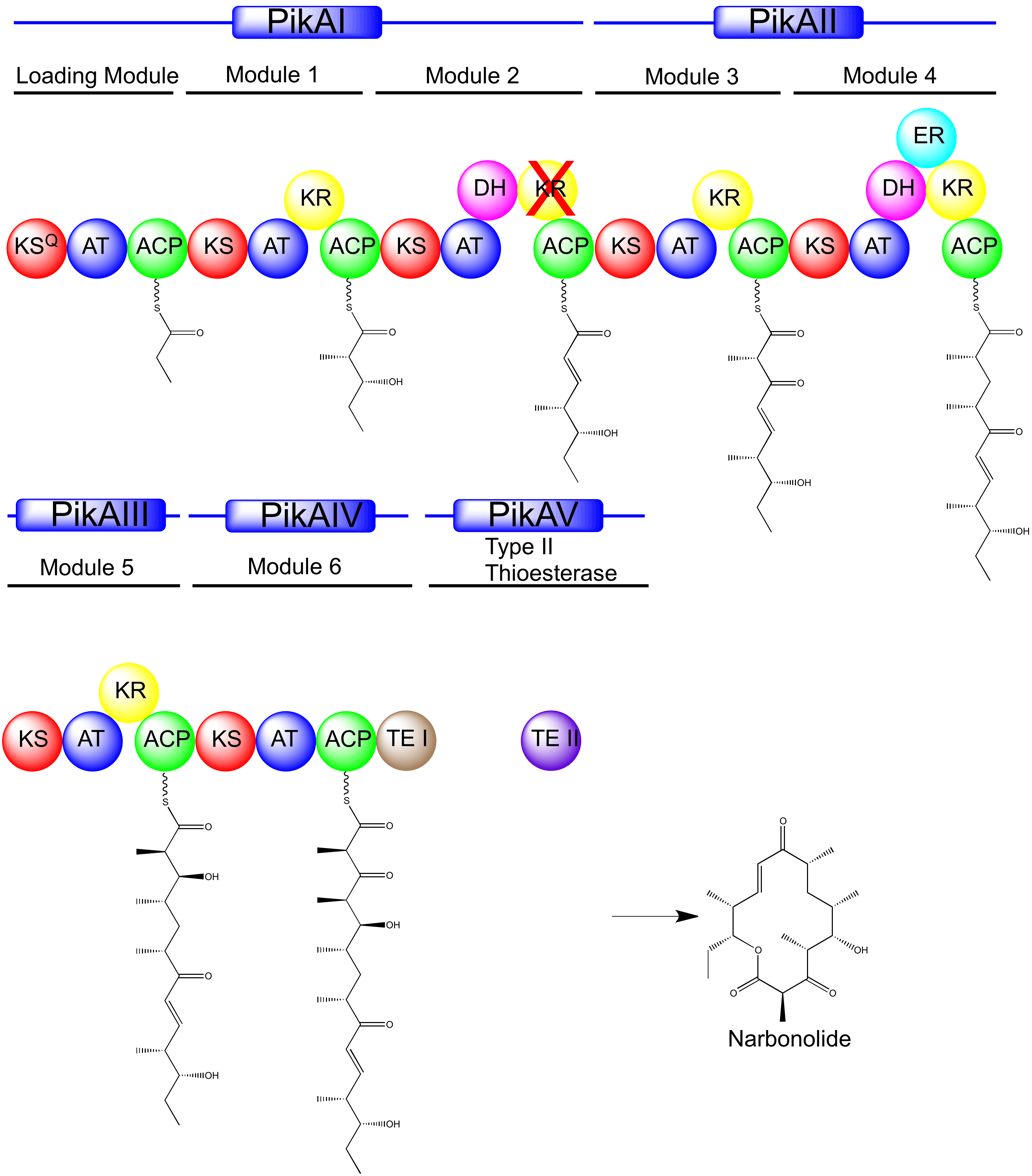
Figure 1: Domain organization of PKS for Narbonolide, a precursor of Pikromycin

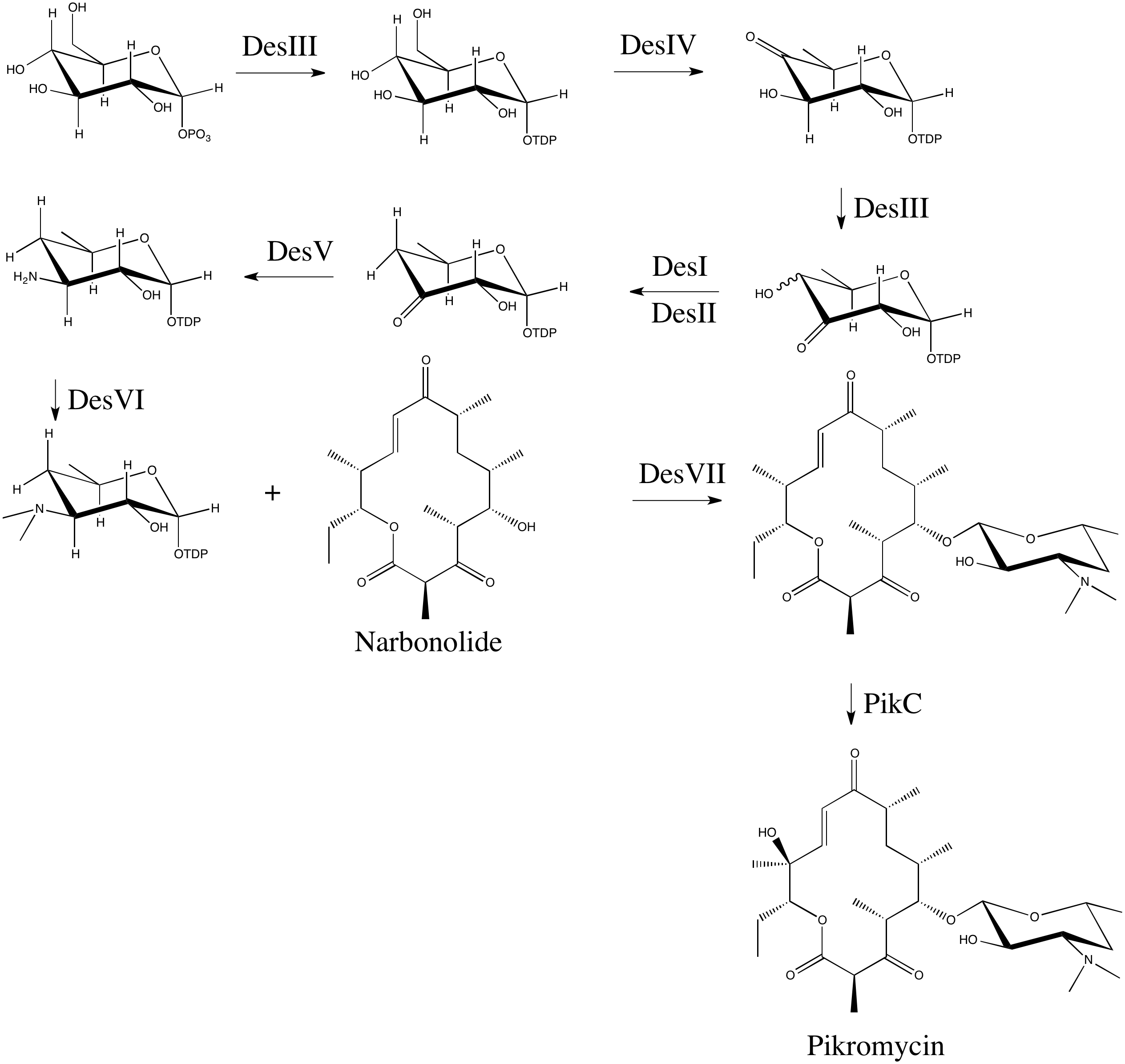
Figure 2: Pikromycin Formation through the desosamine deoxyamino sugar biosynthetic pathway

== See also ==
- Polyketide synthase
- Erythromycin
