= Mildred Rebstock =

American chemist

Mildred Catherine Rebstock
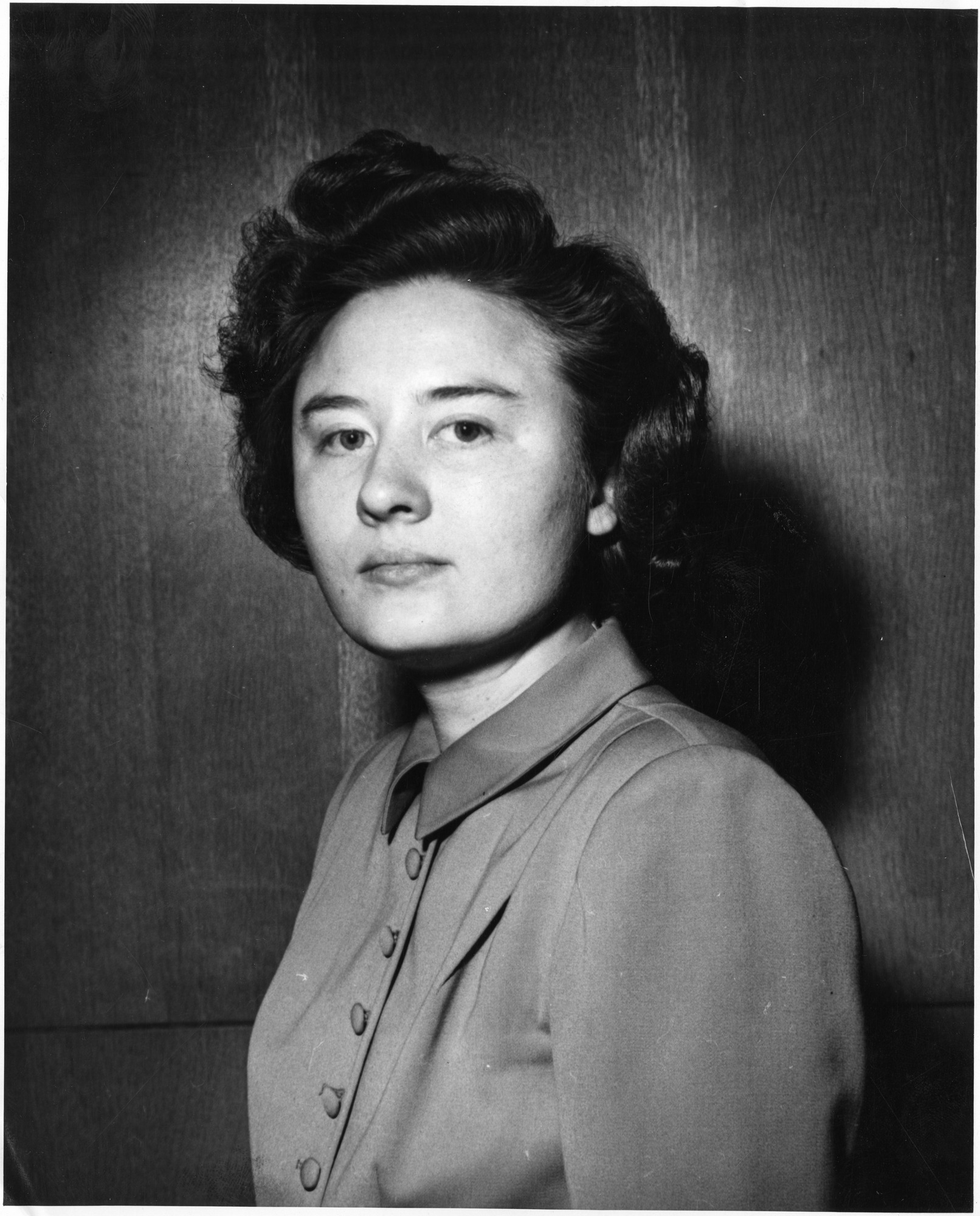
- Rebstock in 1951
- Born: November 29, 1919; Elkhart, Indiana
- Died: February 17, 2011 (aged 91); Ann Arbor
- Education: North Central College, University of Illinois at Urbana-Champaign
- Known for: Synthesizing chloromycetin
- Awards: Women's National Press Club of Washington DC "Science Woman of the Year" (1950)
- Scientific career
- Fields: Chemistry

Mildred Catherine Rebstock (November 29, 1919 – February 17, 2011) was an American pharmaceutical chemist. She and her team were the first to fully synthesize chloromycetin, also known as chloramphenicol. This was the first instance of an antibiotic being fully synthesized. The World Health Organization classifies it as critically important for human medicine.

== Early life and education ==
Mildred Catherine Rebstock, the daughter of Redna and Adolph Rebstock, was born Nov. 29, 1919 in Elkhart, Indiana. In 1938 she graduated from Elkhart High School, and then went on to further her education at North Central College. During her time at North Central, she was a member of a biology honors society, Beta Beta Beta, and was a member of the college's zoology club. She also retained a flawless grade-point average while studying under professors I.A. Koten and Harold Eigenbrodt of chemistry and zoology respectively. It was with these two professors where she found the inspiration to apply to their alma mater, the University of Illinois at Urbana-Champaign to pursue a doctoral degree after she graduated North Central with a bachelor's in 1942. With her impeccable grade-point average and passion for the sciences, she was able to receive a full fellowship to research ascorbic acid while studying at the university She earned her master's degree in 1943 and her doctorate in 1945. In 1945, Mildred was one of the graduate students initiated into Phi Beta Kappa and Sigma Xi.

== Professional career ==
Dr. Rebstock was hired at Parke-Davis Research Labs from 1945 to 1977 as a junior research chemist and was later promoted to a research leader in 1959. Around this time she and her team were researching a newly discovered antibiotic streptomycin, first discovered by Albert Schatz. Parke-Davis's team of Dr. Rebstock and her team consisting of John Controulis, Harry Crooks, and Quentin Bartz discovered that greater chemical stability could be achieved through catalytic hydrogenation of streptomycin, and this new compound was named dihydrostreptomycin. This discovery was simultaneously made by a team at Merck & Co. Although the use of this antibiotic in humans has ceased, it is still used in veterinary medicine.

Soon after her work with dihydrostreptomycin, Dr. Rebstock was tasked with synthesizing a new antibiotic found by John Ehrlich in a culture of Streptomyces venezuela. The molecule of this antibiotic was much simpler than those of previous antibiotics, which made Rebstock's task easier. It was discovered that the key constituent of this molecule was a nitrobenzene ring, which was something the lab had already had prior experience with. Rebstock had found a way to fully synthesize this antibiotic around November 1947. This was a rare case where the synthetization of a molecule was more cost effective than fermenting it through organic processes. The team published their work in 1949. Because of the availability of chloromycetin after Rebstock's work, it was abundantly used to treat Rocky Mountain spotted fever and typhoid fever, and is still used today as a secondary course of action for extreme cases of meningitis, cholera, and other infectious bacterial diseases. Since its discovery, chloromycetin has been linked to an increased risk of fatal aplastic anemia leading to a decline in its use in humans in the United States. Although it has fallen out of favor in developed nations it is still a vital antibiotic used abundantly in developing nations.

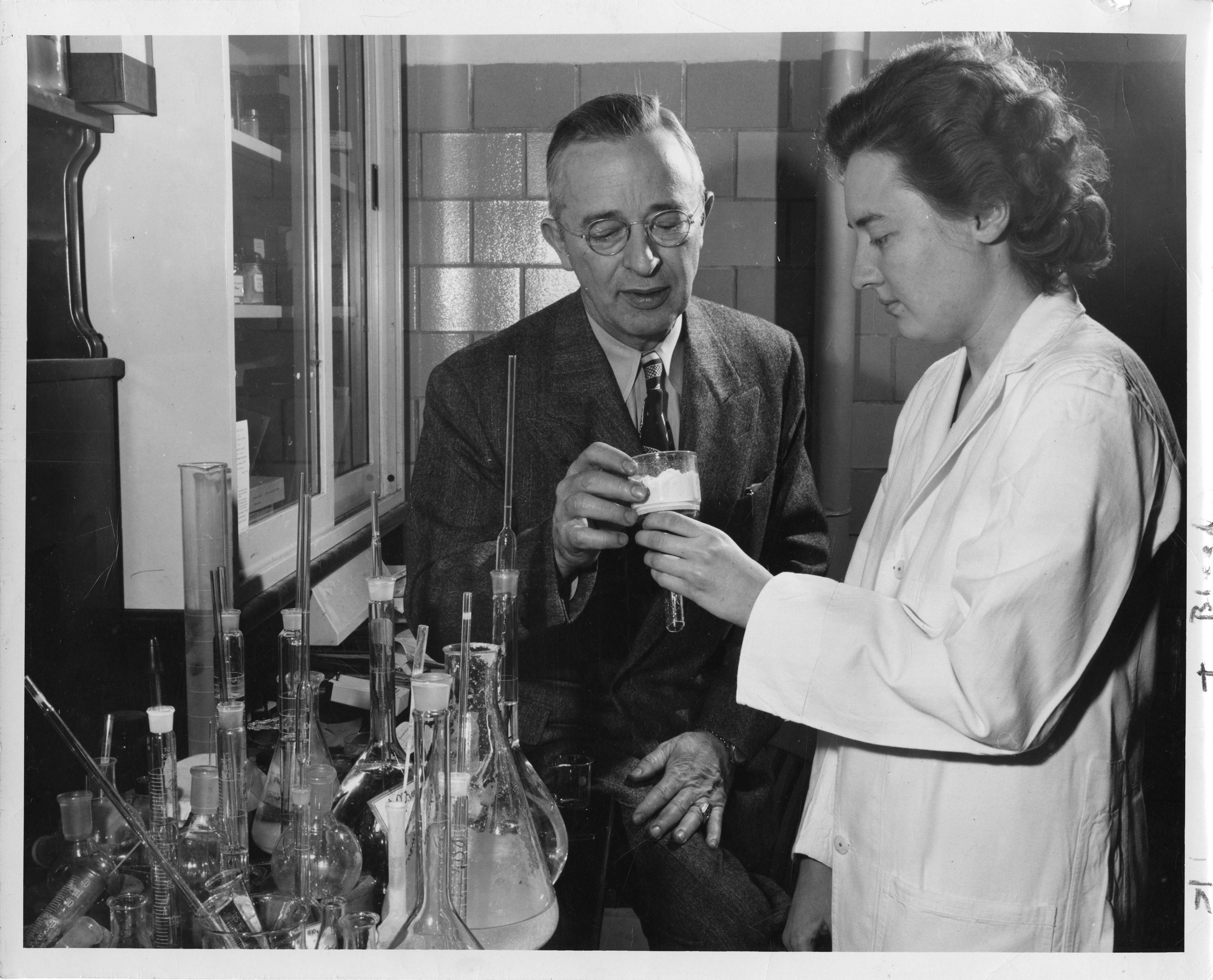
Mildred Rebstock and Eugene H. Payne. Payne had run the first clinical trials with chloromycetin.

Because of her groundbreaking research, Time magazine devoted an article to her in 1949, noting that "the achievement was due to teamwork. But a large part of the credit goes to pretty Dr. Mildred Rebstock, a 28-year-old research chemist." Dr. Rebstock advocated for women in scientific research during an interview with the Smithsonian Institution Archives, she stated that, of all the researchers in the field only about three percent of them were women, but she would remain hopeful for the future. In 1950, Rebstock was awarded the "Science Woman of the Year" by the Women's National Press Club of Washington DC organization, and it was presented to her by President Truman.

== Death and remembrance ==
Rebstock died at St. Joseph Mercy Hospital in Ann Arbor, MI on February 17, 2011.

A historical marker about Rebstock's career and honors can be found on the campus of North Central College, near the football field.
