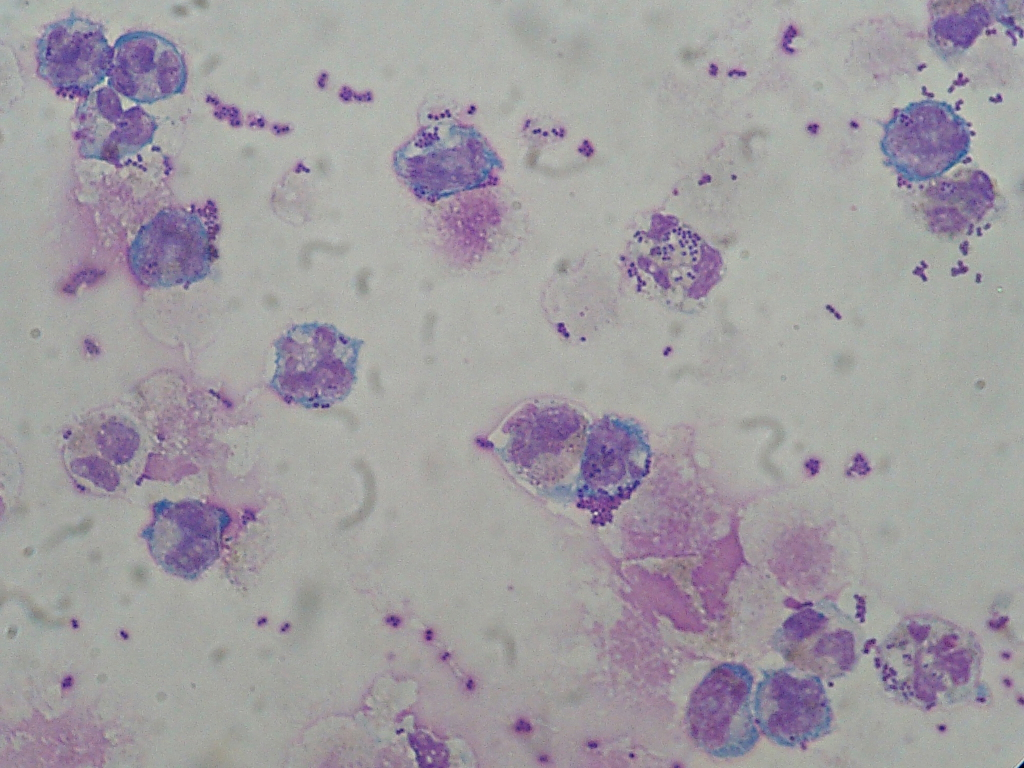
- Staphylococcus capitis in cerebrospinal fluid.

Scientific classification
- Domain: Bacteria
- Kingdom: Bacillati
- Phylum: Bacillota
- Class: Bacilli
- Order: Caryophanales
- Family: Staphylococcaceae
- Genus: Staphylococcus
- Species: S. capitis

Binomial name
- Staphylococcus capitis Kloos and Schleifer 1975 (Approved Lists 1980)

= Staphylococcus capitis =

Species of bacterium

Staphylococcus capitis is a coagulase-negative species (CoNS) of Staphylococcus. It is part of the normal flora of the skin of the human scalp, face, neck, scrotum, and ears and has been associated with prosthetic valve endocarditis, but is rarely associated with native valve infection.

== Microbiology ==
Staphylococcus capitis is a bacterium that colonizes the skin, scalp, face and neck. Staphylococcus capitis typically colonises the skin of the head (especially the ears and forehead), arms, and, sometimes, legs. According to one study, head and arm populations of S. capitis persisted over the course of one year in 20% of individuals. Staphylococcus capitis species has two subspecies: subsp. urealyticus, and subsp. capitis; both may become pathogenic in humans. During antibiotic therapy, the former (but not the latter) expands its distribution beyond the head.

=== Morphology ===
Staphylococcus capitis was originally detected in human skin in 1975 and categorized as a coagulase negative staphylococci (CoNS) species. Staphylococcus capitis bacteria preferentially dwell on the skin and mucous membranes of humans and other warm-blooded animals. Warm-blooded creatures provide a very conducive environment for bacteria to grow, since the ideal temperature for bacteria to thrive is between 30 and 37 degrees Celsius. They are tolerated by the human immune system when applied to the skin. Because of their inept behavior, they must be translated. Bacteria are spherical cells 0.5 to 1.5 μm in diameter, not rod-shaped. Staphylococci are incapable of active movement and are organized singly, in pairs, or in grape-like clusters. All staphylococci develop anaerobically on one side. That is, they can metabolize even when there is no oxygen present. However, when oxygen is available in their surroundings, their metabolism becomes active. Staphylococcus capitis TE8 was isolated from the skin surface of a healthy adult foot and found to have potent antibacterial action against Gram-positive bacteria such as Staphylococcus aureus. Staphylococcus is a gram-positive bacterial spherule. Some staphylococci are capable of producing free coagulase. Thus, that is used to differentiate Staphylococcus species. In this context, a distinction is made in species between coagulase-positive and coagulase-negative staphylococci. Staphylococcus capitis is a species in the genus that is positive for staph coagulase.

== Research ==
=== Methods ===
Shotgun and paired-end pyrosequencing were one of the technique using to study the genome of S. capitis. Researchers get a 109-fold coverage of the whole genome of S. capitis. The clinical and subclinical isolates are found in a broad variety of clades and do not exhibit any evident link, according to analysis of the 16S RNA genes from the genome sequences of Staphylococcus spp. from bovine and buffalo mastitis cases.

=== Genomics ===
Staphylococcus capitis is a coagulase-negative staphylococci opportunistic pathogen (CoNS). S. capitis was described as the absence of accessible full genome sequences in S. capitis functional genomic investigations was restricted to this day. S. capitis' connections with S. epidermidis are more evolutionarily than other clinically important negative coagulase staphylococcus. The smallest genome among the closed genomes sequenced to date is S. capitis with the least expected CDS. The paucity of full genome sequences for S. capitis has hampered functional genomic investigations thus far. Other therapeutically relevant coagulase negative staphylococci have closer evolutionary ties to S. epidermidis than S. capitis. There are 2304 protein-coding DNA sequences predicted on the chromosome, six rRNA operons, 63 tRNA genes, and a single tmRNA gene. With the fewest projected CDS of all closed staphylococcal genomes sequenced to date, S. capitis has the smallest genome of all closed staphylococcal genomes sequenced to date. Proteases like ClpP in S. Capitis, which helps create biofilms, and SepA, which has been demonstrated to degrade host antimicrobial peptides in CoNS, as well as hemolysins, lipases, and esterases, are among them. In contrast to the acute illness enabled by conventional exoproteins of the more virulent staphylococcal species, S. aureus, these proteins are expected to facilitate immune evasion, host colonization, and persistence.

Staphylococci are organized individually, in pairs or clusters similar to grapes, and cannot be actively migrated. All staphylococci are anaerobic unilaterally growing. They have catalase instead of oxidase: an enzyme that turns hydrogen peroxide in oxygen and water into energy. As the information written above is based on the phylogeny of S. Capitis, this can be listed into an evolution relationship section that briefly describes their morphology and how they were found to be related to other Staph families.

=== Evolution ===
This bacterium’s evolution through genome expression in very detail and in comparison with other relatives of the Staphylococci as well with experiments and data that have been collected in the past. S. capitis’ genomes with a deeper understanding of this species and how evolutionary related it is to other Bacterium (S. capitis has a closer evolutionary link to S. epidermidis than other clinically relevant coagulase negative staphylococci), we could discover with more information whether this species' cause of the disease is connected to other species. Although they cause different pathogenic virulence, they have many similar features in their genetics and morphology. The main causes of nosocomial infections, in particular nosocomial bacteremias, have emerged as coagulase-negative staphylococci (CoNS). The capacity to produce biofilm from implanted equipment surfaces is CoNS's most significant mechanism for pathogenicity. Starting very early, research into biofilm formation in Staphylococcus epidermidis has served as a model for other staphylococci such as Staphylococcus aureus and other CoNS species. Moreover, data also showed that S. capitis have a strain (AYP1020) that researchers use to general genomic characteristics compared to S. epidermidis’ strain (RP62a). Thus, in comparison study, S. epidermidis (RP62a) was identified as a near related with S. capitis and as the therapeutically highly significant coagulase-negative staphylococci (CoNS). This source showed very detailed studies of S. Capitis’ relationship among its Staph families highlighting clearly the significance between itself and S. epidermidis.

== Role in disease ==
Although bacteria of the species Staphylococcus capitis are a natural element of human flora, they may become pathogenic in immunocompromised patients who might develop poisoning symptoms and endocarditis as a result of microorganisms entering the body.

S. capitis has been linked to peritoneal dialysis peritonitis, prosthetic-valve endocarditis, pacemaker endocarditis, meningitis, acetabulum osteomyelitis, and spondylodiscitis, according to case reports. It's also a well-known pathogen in neonatal sepsis, where genetic fingerprinting has shown its ability for clonal nosocomial dissemination; S. capitis may cause late-onset sepsis in pre-term neonates, possibly by first colonising the immature - and consequently more permeable - neonatal gut before entering the bloodstream from the gut. It is known to cause infection surrounding prosthetic devices, as is the case with other CoNS. It is infrequently recognized as a cause of endocarditis.

CoNS produce a slimy biofilm enabling them to adhere to medical devices such as prosthetic valves and catheters and makes them difficult to remove by patient immune response to antibiotic therapy. As native flora of the skin and mucous membranes, they may be introduced anytime these are punctured, i.e. at the time of device placement, venipuncture, or through breaks in the mucous membrane or skin. CoNS species, such as S. epidermidis and S. capitis, are recorded as the most common cause of prosthetic valve endocarditis.

Staphylococcus capitis, fortunately, has a lower propensity to antibiotic resistance and also produces less biofilm than many other CoNS. This improves chances of successful eradication of S. capitis in periprosthetic infections (as total knee and total hip arthroplasty infections) relative to other CoNS such as S. epidermidis.

It can be sampled from prosthetic joint infections, most likely contracted from surgery. It can readily spread in the hospital environment, necessitating awareness and proper measures to curb spread.

=== Antibiotic resistance ===
S. capitis may exhibit multidrug resistance, including to methicillin, and fluoroquinolone.
