= Chloramphenicol =

Antibiotic

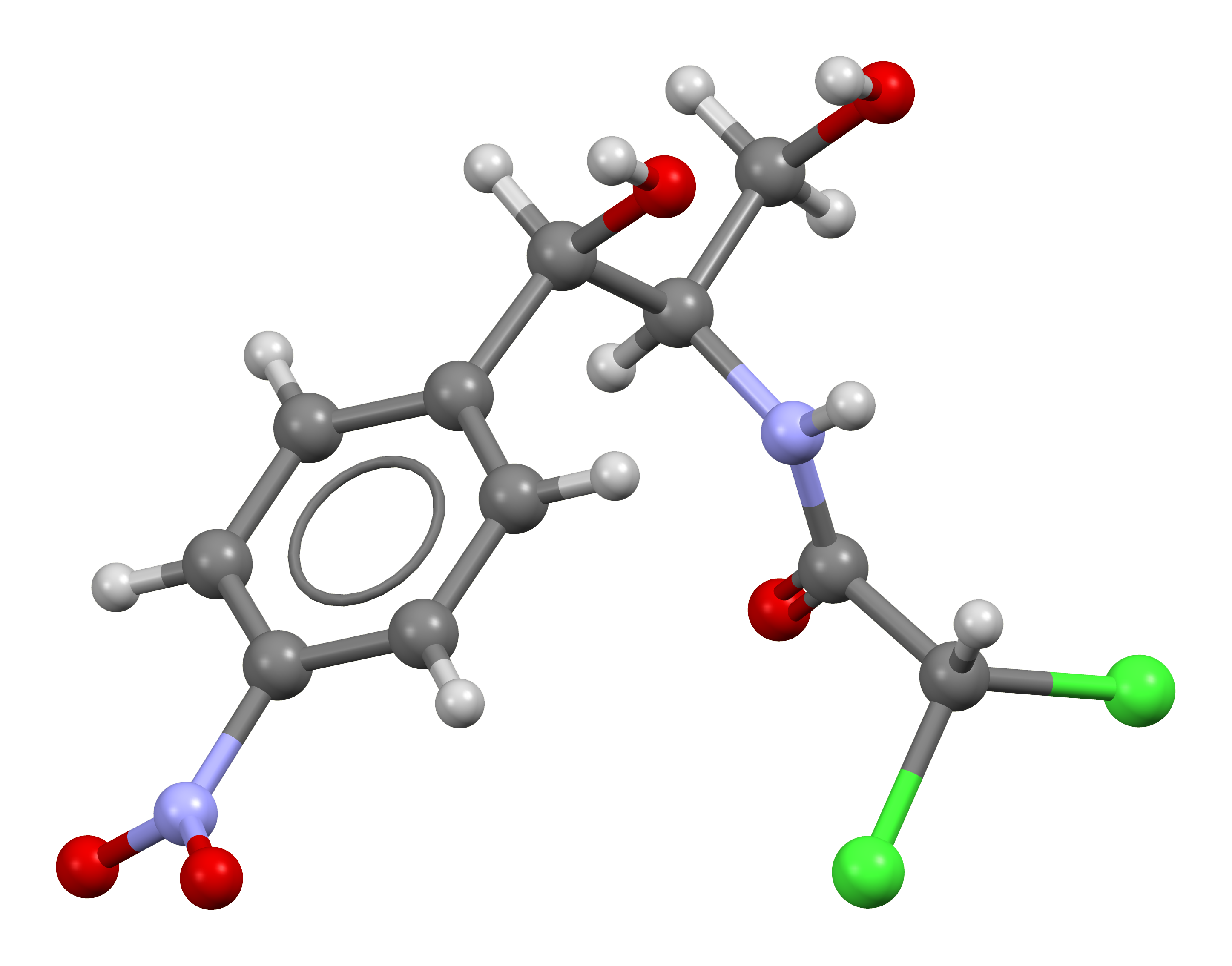

Clinical data
- Trade names: Chloromycetin, Abeed, others
- Other names: C/CHL/CL
- AHFS/Drugs.com: Monograph
- MedlinePlus: a608008
- License data: US DailyMed: Chloramphenicol
- Pregnancy category: AU: A
- Routes of administration: Topical (eye drops), by mouth, intravenous, intramuscular
- ATC code: D06AX02 (WHO) D10AF03 (WHO), G01AA05 (WHO), J01BA01 (WHO), S01AA01 (WHO), S02AA01 (WHO), S03AA08 (WHO), QJ51BA01 (WHO)

Legal status
- Legal status: AU: S3 (Pharmacist only); CA: ℞-only; UK: P (Pharmacy medicines) / POM; US: ℞-only

Pharmacokinetic data
- Bioavailability: 75–90%
- Protein binding: 60%
- Metabolism: Liver
- Elimination half-life: 1.6–3.3 hours
- Excretion: Kidney (5–15%), faeces (4%)

Identifiers
- IUPAC name: 2,2-dichloro-N-[(1R,2R)-1,3-dihydroxy-1-(4-nitrophenyl)propan-2-yl]acetamide
- CAS Number: 56-75-7
- PubChem CID: 5959
- DrugBank: DB00446
- ChemSpider: 5744
- UNII: 66974FR9Q1
- KEGG: D00104
- ChEBI: CHEBI:17698
- ChEMBL: ChEMBL130
- PDB ligand: CLM (PDBe, RCSB PDB)
- CompTox Dashboard (EPA): DTXSID7020265
- ECHA InfoCard: 100.000.262

Chemical and physical data
- Formula: C_{11}H_{12}Cl_{2}N_{2}O_{5}
- Molar mass: 323.13 g·mol^{−1}
- 3D model (JSmol): Interactive image
- SMILES: c1cc(ccc1[C@H]([C@@H](CO)NC(=O)C(Cl)Cl)O)[N+](=O)[O-]
- InChI: InChI=1S/C11H12Cl2N2O5/c12-10(13)11(18)14-8(5-16)9(17)6-1-3-7(4-2-6)15(19)20/h1-4,8-10,16-17H,5H2,(H,14,18)/t8-,9-/m1/s1; Key:WIIZWVCIJKGZOK-RKDXNWHRSA-N

Chloramphenicol is an antibiotic useful for the treatment of a number of bacterial infections. This includes use as an eye ointment to treat conjunctivitis. By mouth or by injection into a vein, it is used to treat meningitis, plague, cholera, and typhoid fever. Its use by mouth or by injection is only recommended when safer antibiotics cannot be used. Monitoring both blood levels of the medication and blood cell levels every two days is recommended during treatment.

Common side effects include bone marrow suppression, nausea, and diarrhea. The bone marrow suppression may result in death. To reduce the risk of side effects treatment duration should be as short as possible. People with liver or kidney problems may need lower doses. In young infants, a condition known as gray baby syndrome may occur which results in a swollen stomach and low blood pressure. Its use near the end of pregnancy and during breastfeeding is typically not recommended. Chloramphenicol is a broad-spectrum antibiotic that typically stops bacterial growth by stopping the production of proteins.

Chloramphenicol was discovered after being isolated from Streptomyces venezuelae in 1947. Its chemical structure was identified and it was first synthesized in 1949. It is on the World Health Organization's List of Essential Medicines. It is available as a generic medication.

== Medical uses ==
The original indication of chloramphenicol was in the treatment of typhoid, but the presence of multiple drug-resistant Salmonella typhi has meant it is seldom used for this indication except when the organism is known to be sensitive.

In low-income countries, the WHO no longer recommends only chloramphenicol as first-line to treat meningitis, but recognises it may be used with caution if there are no available alternatives.

During the last decade chloramphenicol has been re-evaluated as an old agent with potential against systemic infections due to multidrug-resistant Gram-positive bacteria (including vancomycin resistant enterococci). In vitro data have shown an activity against the majority (> 80%) of vancomycin resistant E. faecium strains.

In the context of preventing endophthalmitis, a complication of cataract surgery, a 2017 systematic review found moderate evidence that using chloramphenicol eye drops in addition to an antibiotic injection (cefuroxime or penicillin) will likely lower the risk of endophthalmitis, compared to eye drops or antibiotic injections alone.

=== Spectrum ===
Chloramphenicol has a broad spectrum of activity and has been effective in treating ocular infections such as conjunctivitis, blepharitis etc. caused by a number of bacteria including Staphylococcus aureus, Streptococcus pneumoniae, and Escherichia coli. It is not effective against Pseudomonas aeruginosa. The following susceptibility data represent the minimum inhibitory concentration for a few medically significant organisms.

- Escherichia coli: 0.015 – 10,000 μg/mL
- Staphylococcus aureus: 0.06 – 128 μg/mL
- Streptococcus pneumoniae: 2 – 16 μg/mL

Each of these concentrations is dependent upon the bacterial strain being targeted. Some strains of E coli, for example, show spontaneous emergence of chloramphenicol resistance.

=== Resistance ===
Three mechanisms of resistance to chloramphenicol are known: reduced membrane permeability, mutation of the 50S ribosomal subunit, and elaboration of chloramphenicol acetyltransferase. It is easy to select for reduced membrane permeability to chloramphenicol in vitro by serial passage of bacteria, and this is the most common mechanism of low-level chloramphenicol resistance. High-level resistance is conferred by the cat-gene; this gene codes for an enzyme called chloramphenicol acetyltransferase, which inactivates chloramphenicol by covalently linking one or two acetyl groups, derived from acetyl-S-coenzyme A, to the hydroxyl groups on the chloramphenicol molecule. The acetylation prevents chloramphenicol from binding to the ribosome. Resistance-conferring mutations of the 50S ribosomal subunit are rare.

Chloramphenicol resistance may be carried on a plasmid that also codes for resistance to other drugs. One example is the ACCoT plasmid (A=ampicillin, C=chloramphenicol, Co=co-trimoxazole, T=tetracycline), which mediates multiple drug resistance in typhoid (also called R factors).

As of 2014 some Enterococcus faecium and Pseudomonas aeruginosa strains are resistant to chloramphenicol. Some Veillonella spp. and Staphylococcus capitis strains have also developed resistance to chloramphenicol to varying degrees.

Some other resistance genes beyond cat are known, such as chloramphenicol hydrolase, and chloramphenicol phosphotransferase.

== Adverse effects ==
=== Aplastic anemia ===
The most serious side effect of chloramphenicol treatment is aplastic anaemia ('AA'). This effect is rare but sometimes fatal. The risk of AA is high enough that alternatives should be strongly considered. Treatments are available but expensive. No way exists to predict who may or may not suffer this side effect. The effect usually occurs weeks or months after treatment has been stopped, and a genetic predisposition may be involved. It is not known whether monitoring the blood counts of patients can prevent the development of aplastic anaemia, but patients are recommended to have a baseline blood count with a repeat blood count every few days while on treatment. Chloramphenicol should be discontinued if the complete blood count drops. The highest risk is with oral chloramphenicol (affecting 1 in 24,000–40,000) and the lowest risk occurs with eye drops (affecting less than one in 224,716 prescriptions).

=== Bone marrow suppression ===
Chloramphenicol may cause bone marrow suppression during treatment; this is a direct toxic effect of the drug on human mitochondria. This effect manifests first as a fall in hemoglobin levels, which occurs quite predictably once a cumulative dose of 20 g has been given. The anaemia is fully reversible once the drug is stopped and does not predict future development of aplastic anaemia. Studies in mice have suggested existing marrow damage may compound any marrow damage resulting from the toxic effects of chloramphenicol.

=== Leukemia ===
Leukemia, a cancer of the blood or bone marrow, is characterized by an abnormal increase of immature white blood cells. The risk of childhood leukemia is increased, as demonstrated in a Chinese case–control study, and the risk increases with length of treatment.

=== Gray baby syndrome ===
Intravenous chloramphenicol use has been associated with the so-called gray baby syndrome. This phenomenon occurs in newborn infants because they do not yet have fully functional liver enzymes (i.e. UDP-glucuronyl transferase), so chloramphenicol remains unmetabolized in the body. This causes several adverse effects, including hypotension and cyanosis. The condition can be prevented by using the drug at the recommended doses, and monitoring blood levels.

=== Hypersensitivity reactions ===
Fever, macular and vesicular rashes, angioedema, urticaria, and anaphylaxis may occur. Herxheimer's reactions have occurred during therapy for typhoid fever.

=== Neurotoxic reactions ===
Headache, mild depression, mental confusion, and delirium have been described in patients receiving chloramphenicol. Optic and peripheral neuritis have been reported, usually following long-term therapy. If this occurs, the drug should be promptly withdrawn. It is theorized that this is caused by chloramphenicol's effects on the metabolism of B-Vitamins, specifically B-12.

=== Myelodysplastic Syndrome ===
Although rare, Chloramphenicol exposure is associated with some cases of MDS. There is a report of a positive response to immunosuppressive treatment.

== Pharmacokinetics ==
Chloramphenicol is extremely lipid-soluble; it remains relatively unbound to protein and is a small molecule. It has a large apparent volume of distribution and penetrates effectively into all tissues of the body, including the brain. Distribution is not uniform, with highest concentrations found in the liver and kidney, with lowest in the brain and cerebrospinal fluid. The concentration achieved in brain and cerebrospinal fluid is around 30 to 50% of the overall average body concentration, even when the meninges are not inflamed; this increases to as high as 89% when the meninges are inflamed.

Chloramphenicol increases the absorption of iron.

=== Use in special populations ===
Chloramphenicol is metabolized by the liver to chloramphenicol glucuronate (which is inactive). In liver impairment, the dose of chloramphenicol must therefore be reduced. No standard dose reduction exists for chloramphenicol in liver impairment, and the dose should be adjusted according to measured plasma concentrations.

The majority of the chloramphenicol dose is excreted by the kidneys as the inactive metabolite, chloramphenicol glucuronate. Only a tiny fraction of the chloramphenicol is excreted by the kidneys unchanged. Plasma levels should be monitored in patients with renal impairment, but this is not mandatory. Chloramphenicol succinate ester (an intravenous prodrug form) is readily excreted unchanged by the kidneys, more so than chloramphenicol base, and this is the major reason why levels of chloramphenicol in the blood are much lower when given intravenously than orally.

=== Dose monitoring ===
Plasma levels of chloramphenicol must be monitored in neonates and patients with abnormal liver function. Plasma levels should be monitored in all children under the age of four, the elderly, and patients with kidney failure. Because efficacy and toxicity of chloramphenicol are associated with a maximum serum concentration, peak levels (one hour after the intravenous dose is given) should be 10–20 μg/mL with toxicity > 40 μg/mL; trough levels (taken immediately before a dose) should be 5–10 μg/mL.

=== Drug interactions ===
Administration of chloramphenicol concomitantly with bone marrow depressant drugs is contraindicated, although concerns over aplastic anaemia associated with ocular chloramphenicol have largely been discounted.

Chloramphenicol is a potent inhibitor of the cytochrome P450 isoforms CYP2C19 and CYP3A4 in the liver. Inhibition of CYP2C19 causes decreased metabolism and therefore increased levels of, for example, antidepressants, antiepileptics, proton-pump inhibitors, and anticoagulants if they are given concomitantly. Inhibition of CYP3A4 causes increased levels of, for example, calcium channel blockers, immunosuppressants, chemotherapeutic drugs, benzodiazepines, azole antifungals, tricyclic antidepressants, macrolide antibiotics, SSRIs, statins, cardiac antiarrhythmics, antivirals, anticoagulants, and PDE5 inhibitors.

=== Drug antagonistic ===
Chloramphenicol is antagonistic with most cephalosporins and using both together should be avoided in the treatment of infections.

=== Drug synergism ===
Chloramphenicol has been demonstrated a synergistic effect when combined with fosfomycin against clinical isolates of Enterococcus faecium.

== Mechanism of action ==
Chloramphenicol is a bacteriostatic agent, inhibiting protein synthesis. It prevents protein chain elongation by inhibiting the peptidyl transferase activity of the bacterial ribosome. It specifically binds to A2451 and A2452 residues in the 23S rRNA of the 50S ribosomal subunit, preventing peptide bond formation. Chloramphenicol directly interferes with substrate binding in the ribosome, as compared to macrolides, which sterically block the progression of the growing peptide.

== History ==
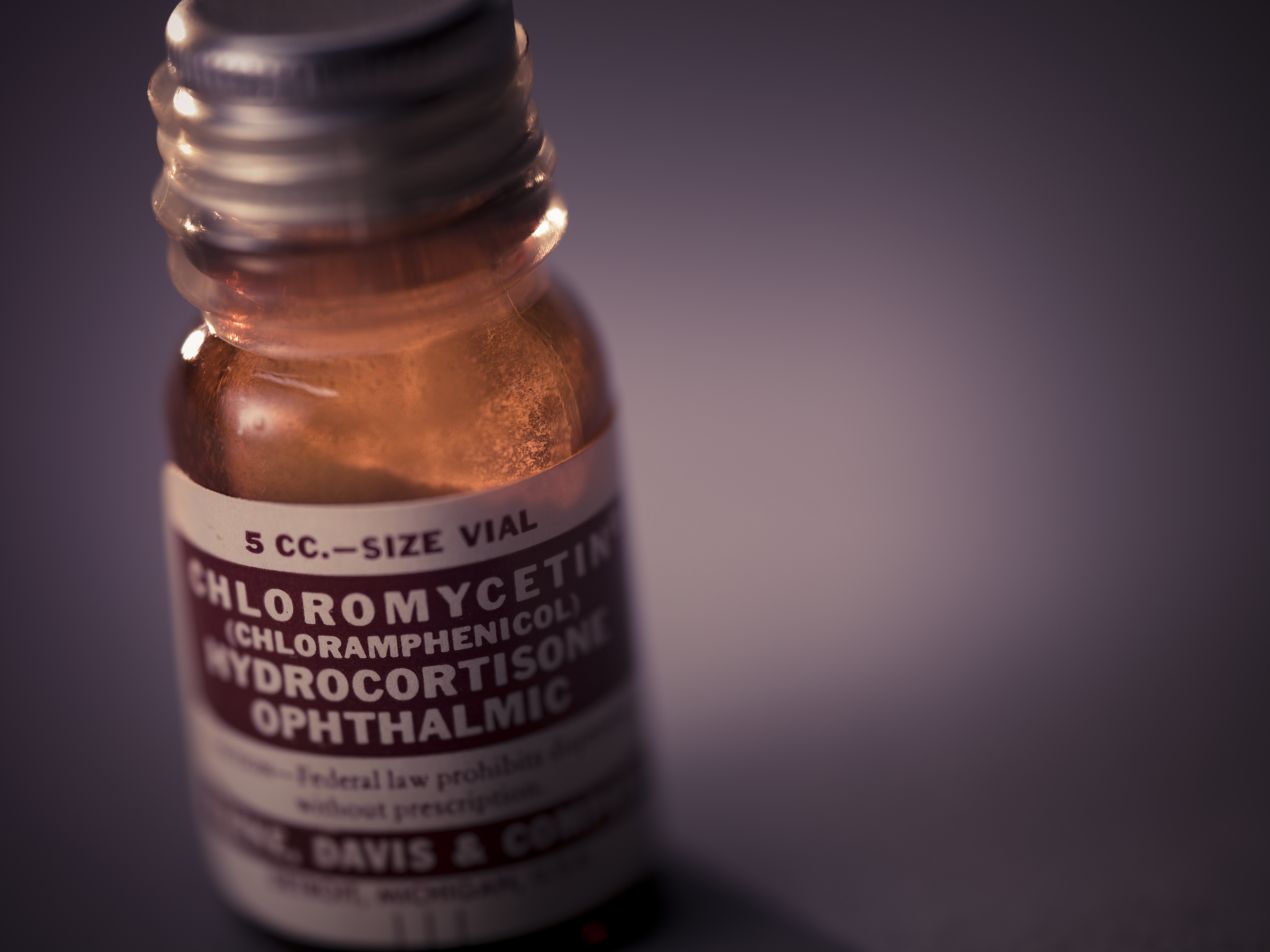
Container of "Chloromycetin", a brand of chloramphenicol and hydrocortisone, from circa 1960s

Chloramphenicol was first isolated from Streptomyces venezuelae in 1947 and in 1949 a team of scientists at Parke-Davis including Mildred Rebstock published their identification of the chemical structure and their synthesis.

In 1972, Senator Ted Kennedy combined the two examples of the Tuskegee Syphilis Study and the 1958 Los Angeles Infant Chloramphenicol experiments as initial subjects of a Senate Subcommittee investigation into dangerous medical experimentation on human subjects.

In 2007, the accumulation of reports associating aplastic anemia and blood dyscrasia with chloramphenicol eye drops led to the classification of "probable human carcinogen" according to World Health Organization criteria, based on the known published case reports and the spontaneous reports submitted to the National Registry of Drug-Induced Ocular Side Effects.

== Society and culture ==
=== Names ===
Chloramphenicol is available as a generic worldwide under many brandnames and also under various generic names in eastern Europe and Russia, including chlornitromycin, levomycetin, and chloromycetin; the racemate is known as synthomycetin.

=== Formulations ===
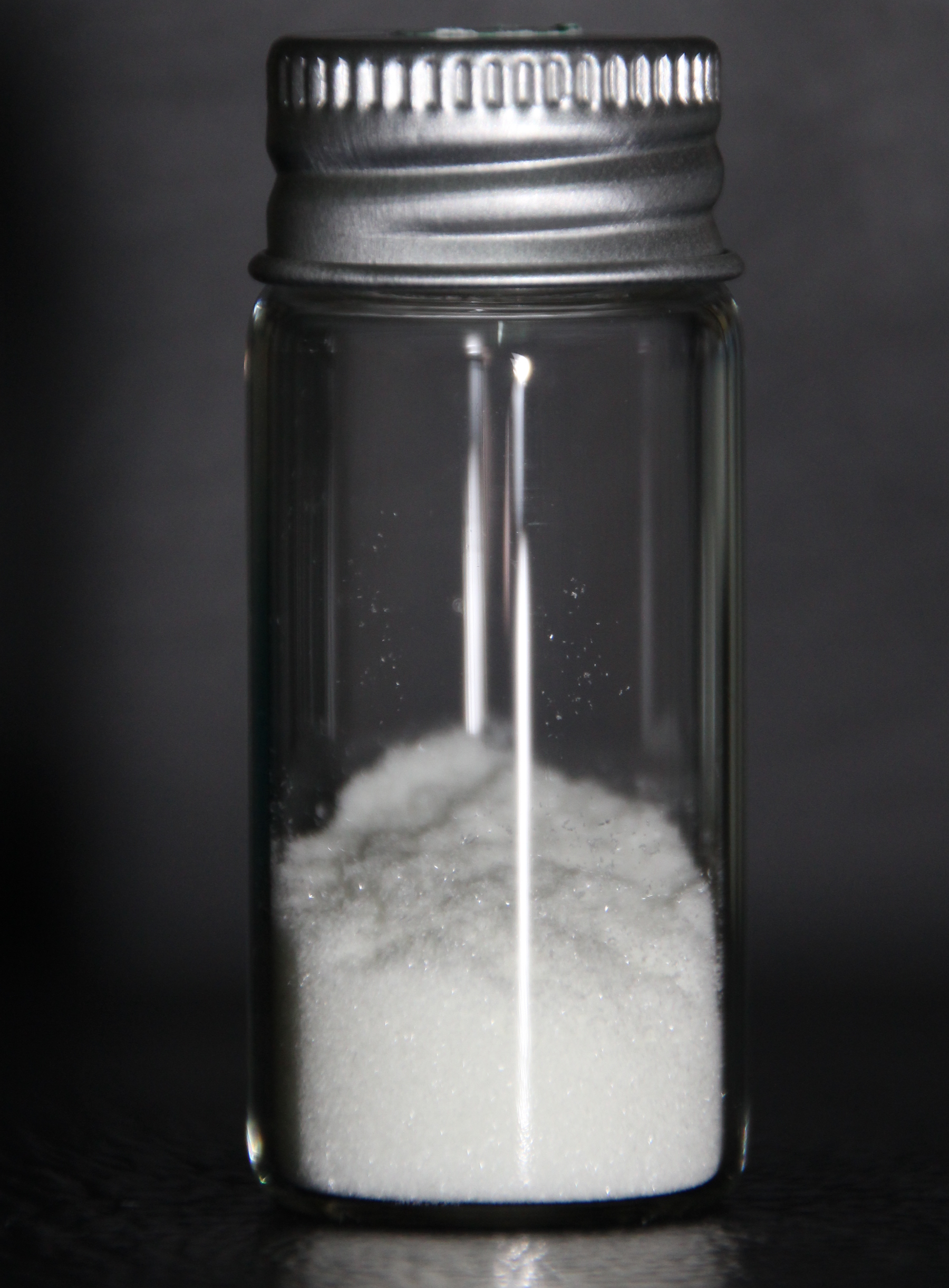
Pure chloramphenicol

Chloramphenicol is available as a capsule or as a liquid. In some countries, it is sold as chloramphenicol palmitate ester (CPE). CPE is inactive, and is hydrolysed to active chloramphenicol in the small intestine. No difference in bioavailability is noted between chloramphenicol and CPE.

Manufacture of oral chloramphenicol in the U.S. stopped in 1991, because the vast majority of chloramphenicol-associated cases of aplastic anaemia are associated with the oral preparation. No oral formulation of chloramphenicol is available in the U.S. for human use.

==== Intravenous ====
The intravenous (IV) preparation of chloramphenicol is the succinate ester. This creates a problem: Chloramphenicol succinate ester is an inactive prodrug and must first be hydrolysed to chloramphenicol; however, the hydrolysis process is often incomplete, and 30% of the dose is lost and removed in the urine. Serum concentrations of IV chloramphenicol are only 70% of those achieved when chloramphenicol is given orally. For this reason, the dose needs to be increased to 75 mg/kg/day when administered IV to achieve levels equivalent to the oral dose.

==== Oily ====
Oily chloramphenicol (or chloramphenicol oil suspension) is a long-acting preparation of chloramphenicol first introduced by Roussel in 1954; marketed as Tifomycine, it was originally used as a treatment for typhoid. Roussel stopped production of oily chloramphenicol in 1995; the International Dispensary Association Foundation has manufactured it since 1998, first in Malta and then in India from December 2004.

Oily chloramphenicol was first used to treat meningitis in 1975 and numerous studies since have demonstrated its efficacy. It is the cheapest treatment available for meningitis (US$5 per treatment course, compared to US$30 for ampicillin and US$15 for five days of ceftriaxone). It has the great advantage of requiring only a single injection, whereas ceftriaxone is traditionally given daily for five days. This recommendation may yet change, now that a single dose of ceftriaxone (cost US$3) has been shown to be equivalent to one dose of oily chloramphenicol.

==== Eye drops ====
Chloramphenicol is used in topical preparations (ointments and eye drops) for the treatment of bacterial conjunctivitis. Isolated case reports of aplastic anaemia following use of chloramphenicol eyedrops exist, but the risk is estimated to be of the order of less than one in 224,716 prescriptions. In Mexico, this is the treatment used prophylactically in newborns for neonatal conjunctivitis.

== Veterinary uses ==
Although its use in veterinary medicine is highly restricted, chloramphenicol still has some important veterinary uses. It is currently considered the most useful treatment of chlamydial disease in koalas. The pharmacokinetics of chloramphenicol have been investigated in koalas.

== Use in meat production ==
In 2026, China refused a shipment of Argentinian beef that tested positive for chloramphenicol and banned any future shipments from that major refrigerator. The antibiotic is banned in meat production in both China and Argentina.

== Synthesis ==
=== Biosynthesis ===
Chloramphenicol is produced by Streptomyces venezuelae. Its biosynthesis has been partially elucidated. A portion of the structure originates from the shikimate pathway, in which aromatic amino acids are formed. The non-proteinogenic amino acid para-aminophenylalanine is also accessible via this pathway (step 1 in the scheme). This intermediate is bound to a peptidyl carrier protein via a thioester (2) and hydroxylated at the benzyl position (3). The amino group is then oxidized to the nitro group (4), the dichloroacetyl group is introduced from an unknown precursor (5), and the intermediate is released as an aldehyde (6). Reduction of the aldehyde group to the alcohol (7) yields chloramphenicol.

Biosynthesis of chloramphenicol starting from aminophenylalanine. In several steps, the intermediates are bound to a carrier protein (shown as a sphere).

Chloramphenicol has also been isolated from the moon snail Lunatia heros, although it has not been investigated whether the biosynthesis is carried out by the snail itself or by associated microorganisms.

Also the biosynthetic gene cluster and pathway for chloroamphenicol was characterized from Streptomyces venezuelae ISP5230 (ATCC 17102). Currently the chloramphenicol biosynthetic gene cluster has 17 genes with assigned roles.

=== Chemical synthesis ===
The synthesis of chloramphenicol can be achieved starting from (2R,3S)-2,3-epoxy-3-phenylpropanoic acid methyl ester (derived from methyl cinnamate, step 1 in the synthesis scheme). Upon reaction with sodium nitrite in the presence of acetic acid, the nitrite attacks the epoxide at position 3, producing a nitrite-masked diol (2). Through reaction with diphenyl azidophosphate, diethyl azodicarboxylate, and triphenyl phosphane, the unmasked hydroxyl group at position 2 is substituted by azides (3). Via catalytic hydrogenation using hydrogen over palladium, the azide group is reduced to the amino group, the nitrite ester to the alcohol, and the carboxylic acid ester likewise to the alcohol, resulting in a side chain with one amino and two hydroxy groups (4). The amino group is functionalized with an acetyl group, and the aromatic ring undergoes sulphuric acid/ nitric acid nitration (5). The acetyl group is then removed, and the dichloroacetyl group is introduced using methyldichloroacetate (6).

Asymmetric total synthesis of chloramphenicol starting from methyl cinnamate

== Plasmid preparation ==
Chloramphenicol is often used when growing E. coli cultures intended for plasmid preparation. Chloramphenicol halts protein synthesis, but allows plasmids with a relaxed origin of replication to keep replicating, thus improving yield.
